= National road 91 (Poland) =

Highway in Poland

Coordinates: 54°07′18″N 18°44′43″E

National Road 91
- Droga krajowa nr 91
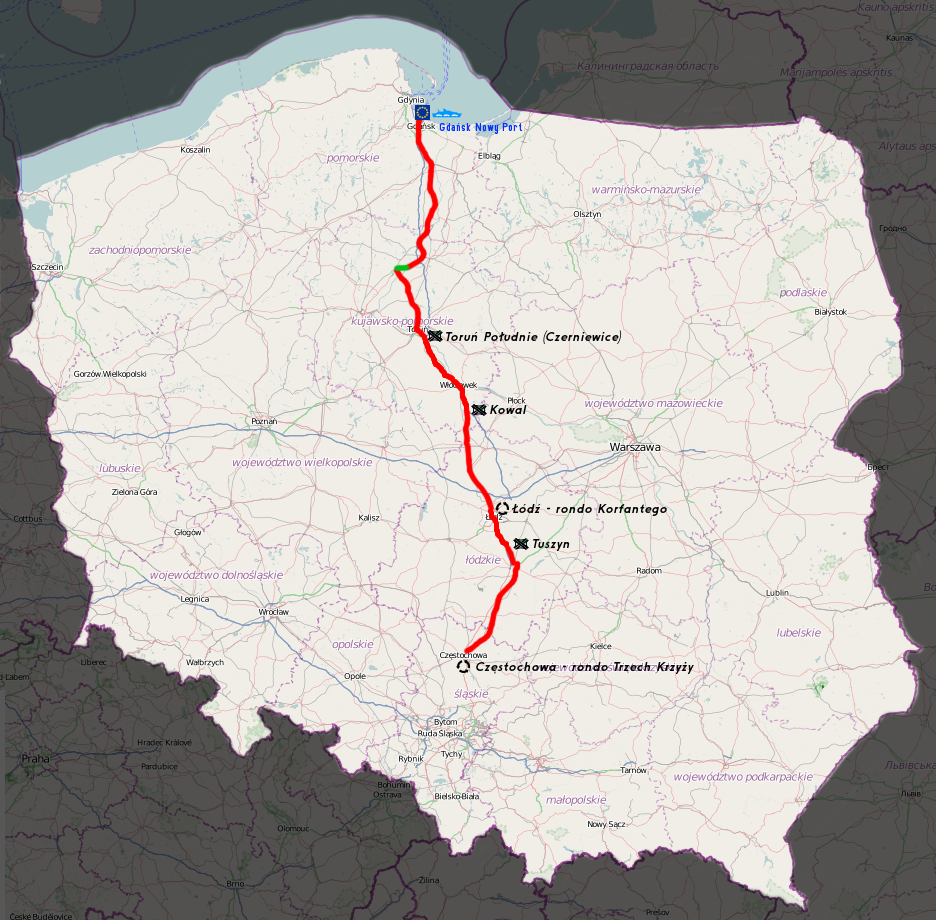
- National road 91 (mostly single lane standard) Concurrency with Expressway S5

Route information
- Maintained by GDDKiA
- Length: 532.5 km (330.9 mi)
- Existed: 2000–present

Major junctions
- From: Gdańsk
- To: Podwarpie

Location
- Country: Poland
- Regions: Pomeranian Voivodeship; Kuyavian-Pomeranian Voivodeship; Łódź Voivodeship; Silesian Voivodeship
- Major cities: Gdańsk, Tczew, Grudziądz, Toruń, Włocławek, Łódź, Piotrków Trybunalski, Częstochowa

Highway system
- National roads in Poland; Voivodeship roads
← DK 90	→ DK 92

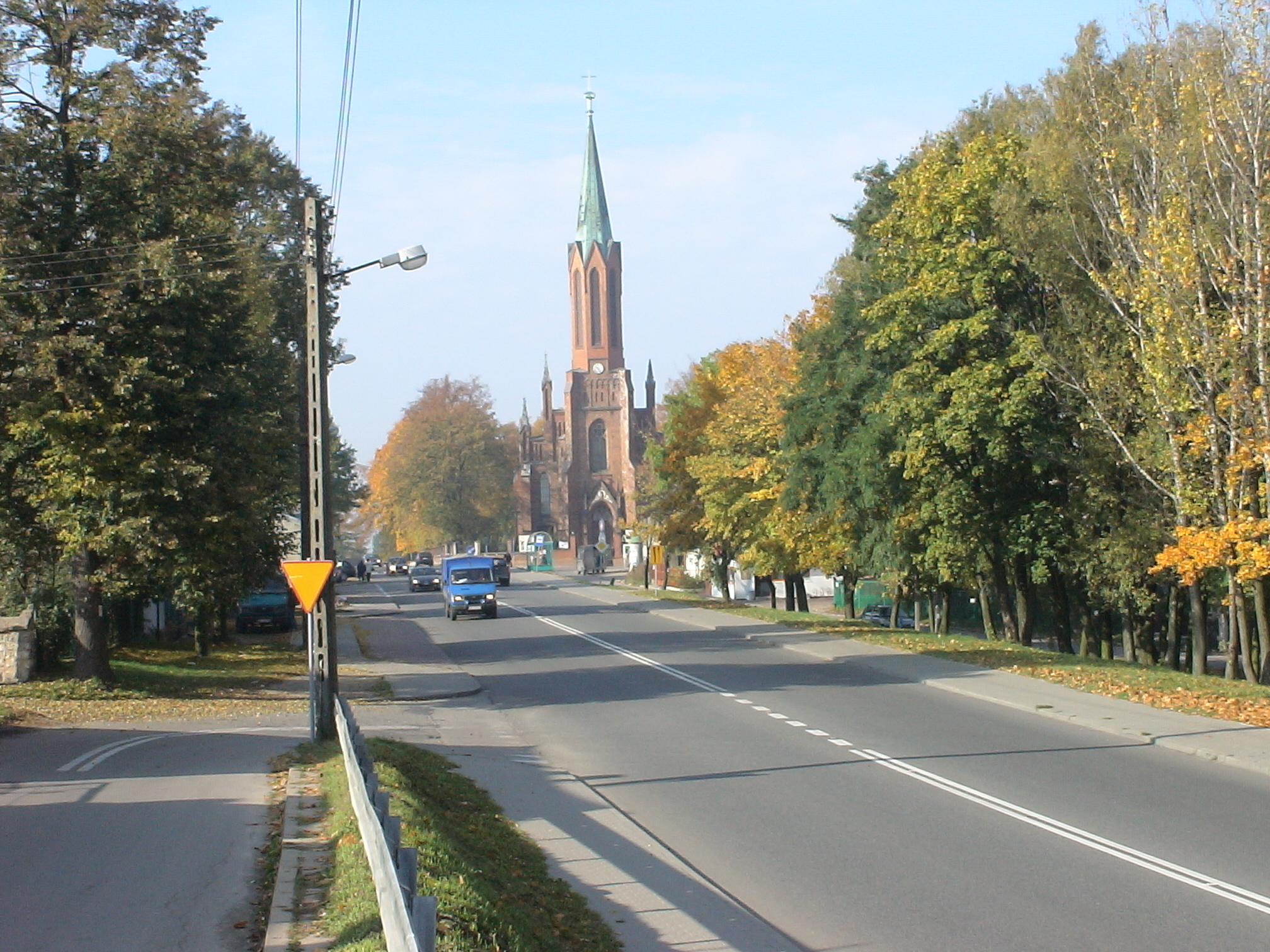
National road 91 in Rędziny

Droga krajowa nr 91 (translates from Polish as national road 91) is a route belonging to Polish national roads network. It runs from the seaport in Gdańsk to Częstochowa, and goes through the Pomeranian, Kuyavian-Pomeranian, Łódź and Silesian Voivodeships. Since this route was renumbered from DK1, it is frequently referred as "stara jedynka" (eng. "old one").

National road 91 is the alternative road for A1 motorway (partially tolled). As such, it runs parallel to:

- existing stretch of motorway A1 from exit "Rusocin" to Piotrków Trybunalski,
- the dual carriageway road (part of national road 1) between Piotrków Trybunalski and Częstochowa built in 1970s, which is currently under reconstruction to the motorway standard.

== Previous route ==
Before 2000, road 91 ran from Gliwice–Rybnik–Wodzisław Śląski–Chałupki to the Czech border. This is now part of road 78.

== Major cities through the route ==
- Rusocin (connects with A1, S6 and national road 1)
- Tczew
- Świecie
- Toruń
- Łódź (national road 14, national road 72)
- Piotrków Trybunalski (expressway S8, national road 12, voivodeship road 716)
- Kamieńsk (voivodeship road 484)
- Radomsko (national road 42, voivodeship road 784)
- Częstochowa (national road 1, national road 46, voivodeship road 786)

== Route plan ==
km	Icon	Name	Crossed roads
0		Roundabout in Rusocin	
x		Railroad crossing in Pszczółki	—
x		Railroad crossing in Tczew	—
21		Tczew	
x		Filling station in Tczew	—
26		Czarlin	
28		Narkowy	
x		Railroad crossing in Subkowy	—
42		Rudno	
50		Cierzpice	
53		Gniew	
x		Gniew	
63		Rakowiec	
65		Mała Karczma	
67		Kolonia Ostrowicka	
71		Pieniążkowo	
77		Nowe	
87		Warlubie	
96		Fletnowo	
97		Dolna Grupa	
x		Tunnel under railway No. 208	—
97		Dolna Grupa	
103		Nowe Marzy	
		Świecie Zachód	
		Chełmno	
		Chełmno	
		Stolno	
		Kończewice	
		Grzywna	
		Ostaszewo	
		Łysomice	
		Toruń	
		Toruń	
		Toruń	
		Toruń	
		Toruń	
		Toruń	
		Toruń Czerniewice – passage under the motorway	
		Brzoza	
		Otłoczyn	
		Nowy Ciechocinek	
		Probostwo	
		Włocławek	
		Włocławek	
		Kowal	
		Kowal	
		Kowal	
		Błonie	
		Bardzinek	
		Topola Królewska	
		Łęczyca	
		Wróblew	
		Ozorków	
		Emilia	(in construction)
		Zgierz	
		Zgierz	
		Roundabout of Alfred Biłyk in Łódź	
		Roundabout of Wojciech Korfanty in Łódź	
		Łódź – Konstantynowska St.	
		Łódź – Pabianicka St.	
		Łódź – Trasa Górna interchange	
		Rzgów	
		Rzgów interchange	
0		Głuchów	
13		Piotrków Trybunalski Północ	
17		Piotrków Trybunalski Wschód	
22		Sulejowskie roundabout in Piotrków Trybunalski	
50		Kamieńsk	
65		Radomsko	
65,5		Radomsko	
68		Radomsko	
71		Bridge over Warta river	—
99		Częstochowa	
102		Częstochowa	
104		Trzech Krzyży Roundabout in Częstochowa	
