= Piaseczno, Tczew County =

Village in Pomeranian Voivodeship, Poland

Piaseczno
- Village
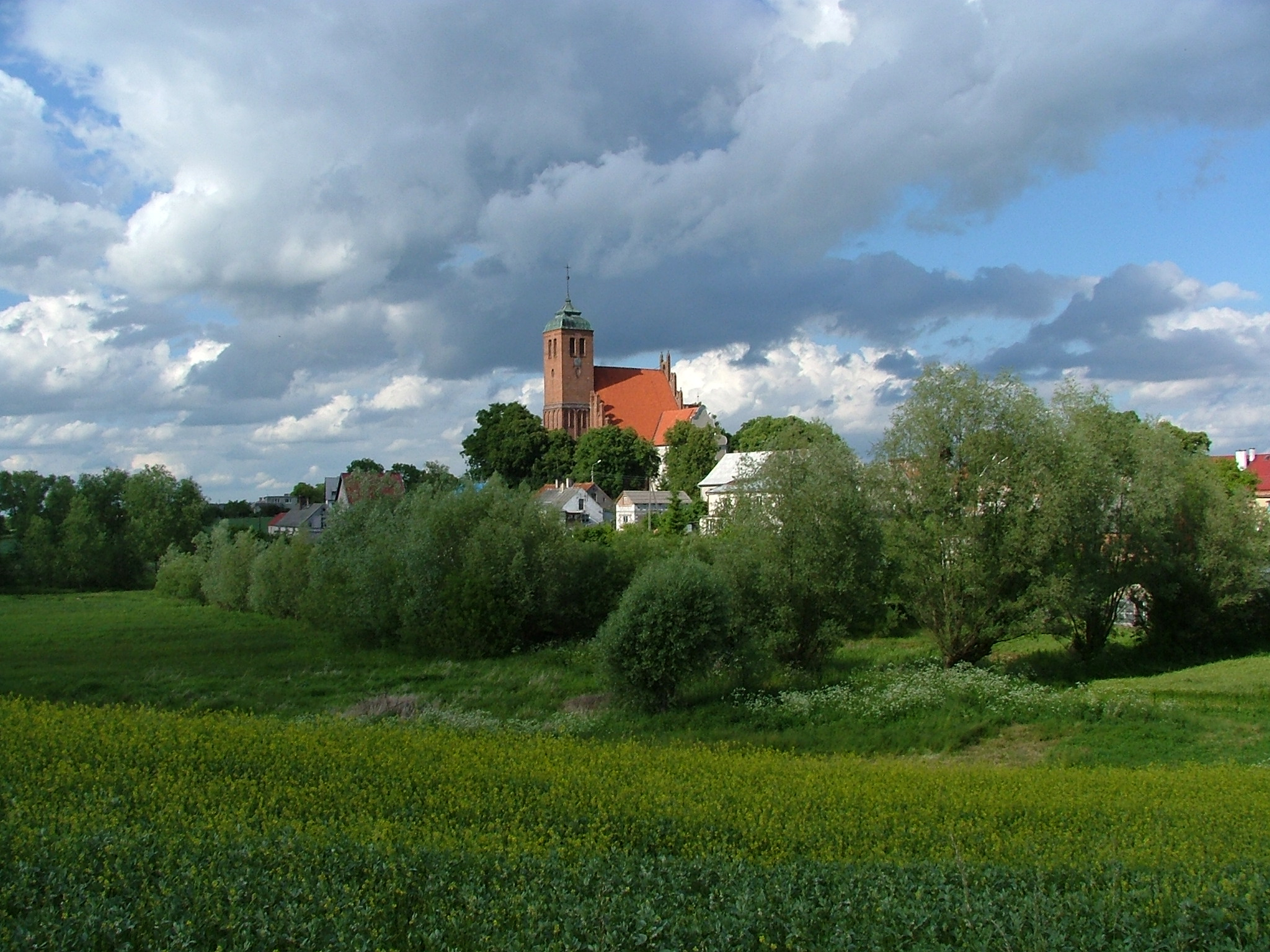
- Panorama of Piaseczno with the Church of the Nativity of the Virgin Mary

- Location within Poland
- Coordinates: 53°48′7″N 18°46′32″E
- Country: Poland
- Voivodeship: Pomeranian
- County: Tczew
- Gmina: Gniew
- Population: 580
- Time zone: UTC+1 (CET)
  - Summer (DST): UTC+2 (CEST)
- Area code: +48 58
- Vehicle registration: GTC

Piaseczno [pjaˈsɛt͡ʂnɔ] is a village in the administrative district of Gmina Gniew, within Tczew County, Pomeranian Voivodeship, in northern Poland. It is located within the ethnocultural region of Kociewie in the historic region of Pomerania.

Piaseczno is a regional Christian pilgrimage destination due to the historic Piaseczno Well. Other sights of the village are the Gothic Church of the Nativity of the Virgin Mary and the Museum of the Polish Peasant Movement.

The settlement Piaseckie Pole is part of the village.

== History ==
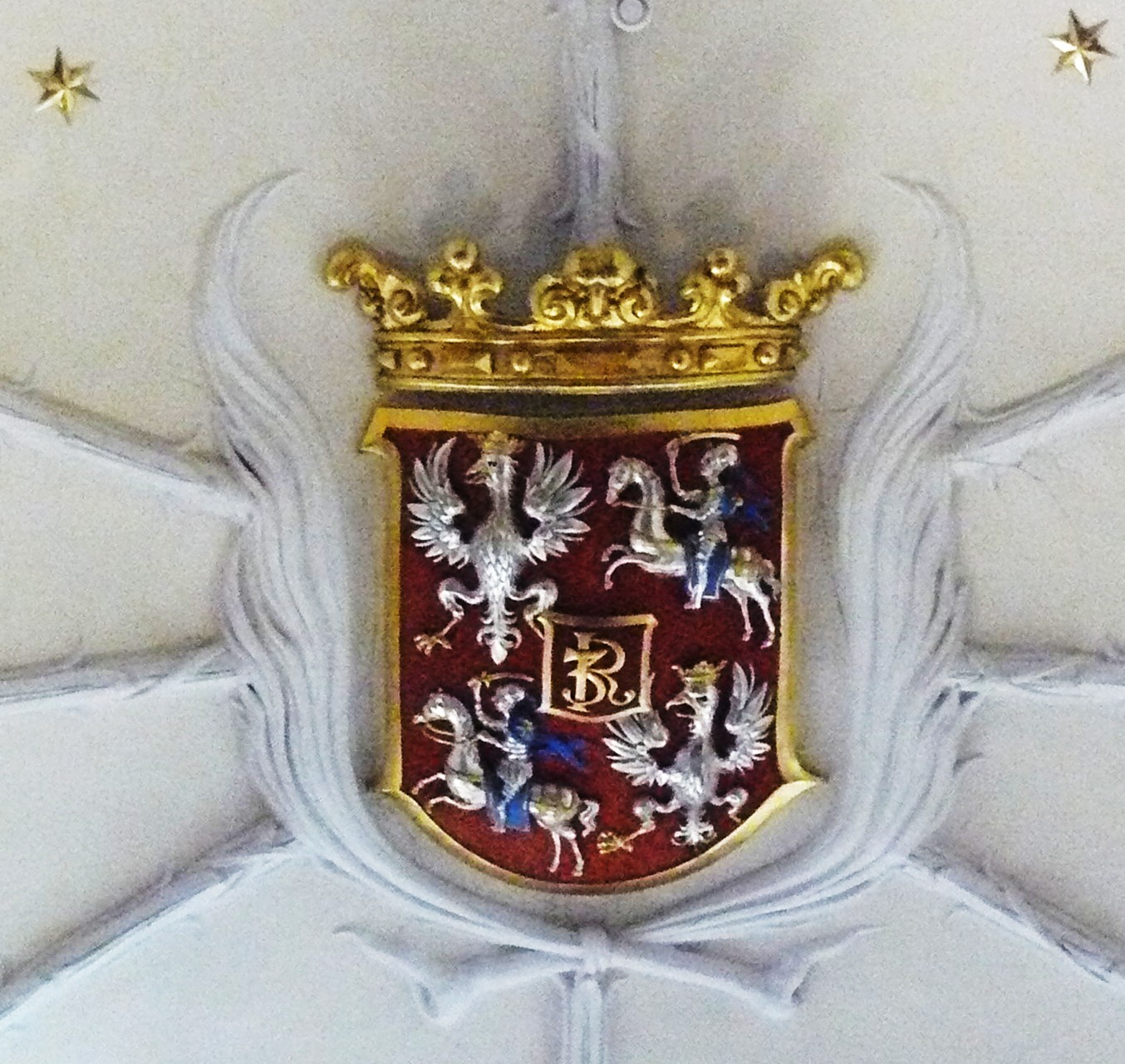
17th-century coat of arms of the Polish–Lithuanian Commonwealth on the vault of the church of the Nativity of the Virgin Mary

The area became part of the emerging Polish state in the 10th century under its first historic ruler Mieszko I. In the 14th century, it was invaded and occupied by the Teutonic Order. First records of the village stem from the time when the region was part of the State of the Teutonic Order. In 1353, Grand Master Winrich von Kniprode assigned the local church to the convent of nuns of Chełmno/Kulm. In 1454, King Casimir IV Jagiellon re-incorporated the region to the Kingdom of Poland, and in 1466, the Teutonic Knights renounced any claims and recognized it as part of Poland.

Piaseczno was a royal village of the Polish Crown, administratively located in the Tczew County in the Pomeranian Voivodeship. It was a popular Catholic pilgrimage destination and was often visited by starost of nearby Gniew and future King of Poland John III Sobieski. As king he ordered the construction of a new, greater vault in the local church of the Nativity of the Virgin Mary, and visited Piaseczno shortly before his death in 1696. His wife, Queen consort of Poland, Marie Casimire visited Piaseczno in 1676.

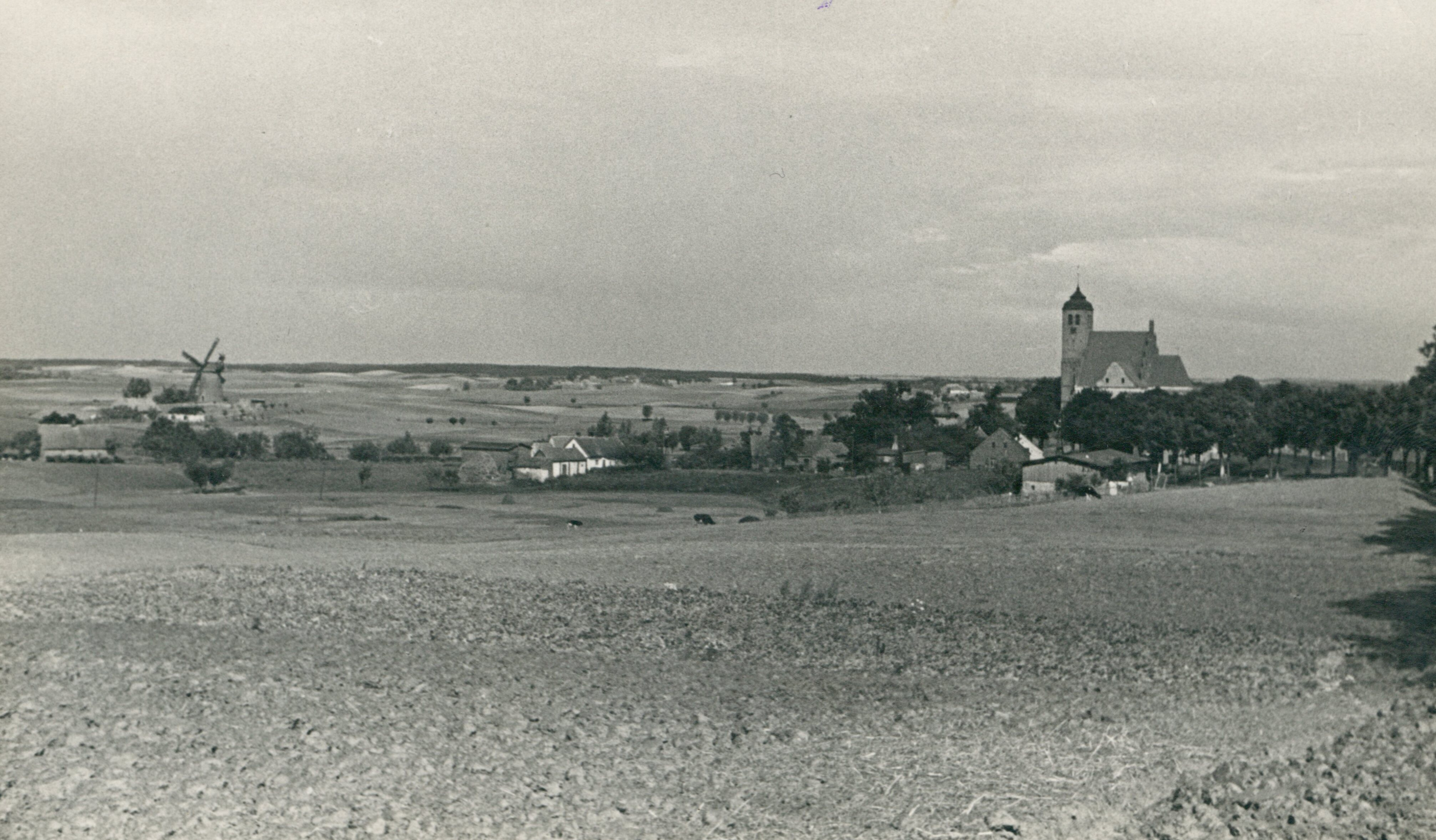
Panorama of the village in the 1930s

In 1862, activist Juliusz Kraziewicz founded the oldest Polish agricultural cooperative (Włościańskie Towarzystwo Rolnicze) in the village. Due to this, the Museum of the Polish Peasant Movement is located in the village. In 1868, the village had a population of 1,066, predominantly Catholic by confession.

During the German occupation of Poland (World War II), the local Polish parish priest Augustyn Bukolt was murdered by the Germans in a mass execution in the Szpęgawski Forest in October 1939 (see Intelligenzaktion).

== Sports ==
The village is represented by the football club KS Piast Piaseczno which was founded in 1969. The club groundshare with local side Mewa Gniew at their 300 capacity stadium in the town of Gniew.
