= Dawid Pożak =

Polish footballer

Personal information
- Date of birth: 15 June 1992 (age 34)
- Place of birth: Lublin, Poland
- Height: 1.75 m (5 ft 9 in)
- Position: Midfielder

Youth career
- Lewart Lubartów

Senior career*
Years	Team	Apps	(Gls)
2008–2012	Lewart Lubartów		
2012–2018	Wisła Puławy	147	(11)
2018–2019	Motor Lublin	20	(1)
2019–2021	Lewart Lubartów	39	(5)
2021	Lublinianka Lublin	8	(0)
- * Club domestic league appearances and goals

Dawid Pożak (born 15 June 1992) is a Polish former professional footballer who played as a midfielder. He has previously played for Lewart Lubartów, Wisła Puławy, Motor Lublin and Lublinianka Lublin.

== Club career ==
Pożak began his career at Lewart Lubartów. He spent three-and-a-half seasons at Lewart before moving to Wisła Puławy in February 2012. He made his professional debut on 14 March 2013 in a 0–0 draw with Stal Rzeszów. On 16 May 2012, he scored his first goal for the club in the 1–0 win against Pelikan Łowicz.

On 30 July 2016, Pożak made his I liga debut against MKS Kluczbork, coming on as a substitute in the 75th minute. In the 2016–17 I liga season, he played in 28 league games, scoring 2 goals. During his six-and-a-half years at Wisła, Pożak made 147 league appearances, scoring eleven goals.

On 13 July 2018, he signed a contract with Motor Lublin. In July 2019, he joined IV liga side Lewart Lubartów.

== Honours ==
Motor Lublin

- Polish Cup (Lublin subdistrict regionals): 2018–19

Lewart Lubartów

- IV liga Lublin: 2019–20
