= Szprudowo =

Village in Pomeranian Voivodeship, Poland

- Village
- Location within Poland
- Coordinates: 53°54′N 18°48′E
- Country: Poland
- Voivodeship: Pomeranian
- County: Tczew
- Gmina: Gniew

Population
  - Total: 366
- Time zone: UTC+1 (CET)
  - Summer (DST): UTC+2 (CEST)
- Vehicle registration: GTC

Szprudowo [ʂpruˈdɔvɔ] is a village in the administrative district of Gmina Gniew, within Tczew County, Pomeranian Voivodeship, in northern Poland. It is located within the ethnocultural region of Kociewie in the historic region of Pomerania.

== History ==
Szprudowo was a royal village of the Polish Crown, administratively located in the Tczew County in the Pomeranian Voivodeship.

During the German occupation of Poland (World War II), in 1939, the Germans murdered some Poles from Szprudowo along with inhabitants of other villages during large massacres in the Szpęgawski Forest, and expelled several Poles, whose farms were handed over to Germans as part of the Lebensraum policy.

== Sport ==
The village is represented by the football club KP Keramzyt Szprudowo. First formed in 2003, the club initially played as Okland Optiroc Szprudowo competing in the Klasa B. Keramzyt Szprudowo currently groundshare with Mewa Gniew at their 300 capacity Gminny Ośrodek Sportu i Rekreacji w Gniewie, a municipal stadium located in the nearby town of Gniew.
