= Abisynia, Tczew County =

Settlement in Pomeranian Voivodeship, Poland

Abisynia
- Hamlet
- Interactive map of Abisynia
- Coordinates: 53°48′04″N 18°47′45″E
- Country: Poland
- Voivodeship: Pomeranian
- County: Tczew
- Gmina: Gniew
- Time zone: UTC+1 (CET)
  - Summer (DST): UTC+2 (CEST)
- Postal code: 83-140
- SIMC: 1037608
- Vehicle registration: GTC

Abisynia [abiˈsɨɲa] is a hamlet in the administrative district of Gmina Gniew, within Tczew County, Pomeranian Voivodeship, in northern Poland. It lies within the ethnocultural region of Kociewie in the historic region of Pomerania.
