= Bielica =

Bielica refers to the following places in Poland:

- Bielica, Pomeranian Voivodeship
- Bielica, Warmian-Masurian Voivodeship
- Bielica, West Pomeranian Voivodeship
