= Półwieś =

Półwieś may refer to the following places:

- Półwieś, Lesser Poland Voivodeship (south Poland)
- Półwieś, Pomeranian Voivodeship (north Poland)
- Półwieś, Warmian-Masurian Voivodeship (north Poland)
