= Nicponia =

Village in Pomeranian Voivodeship, Poland

- Village
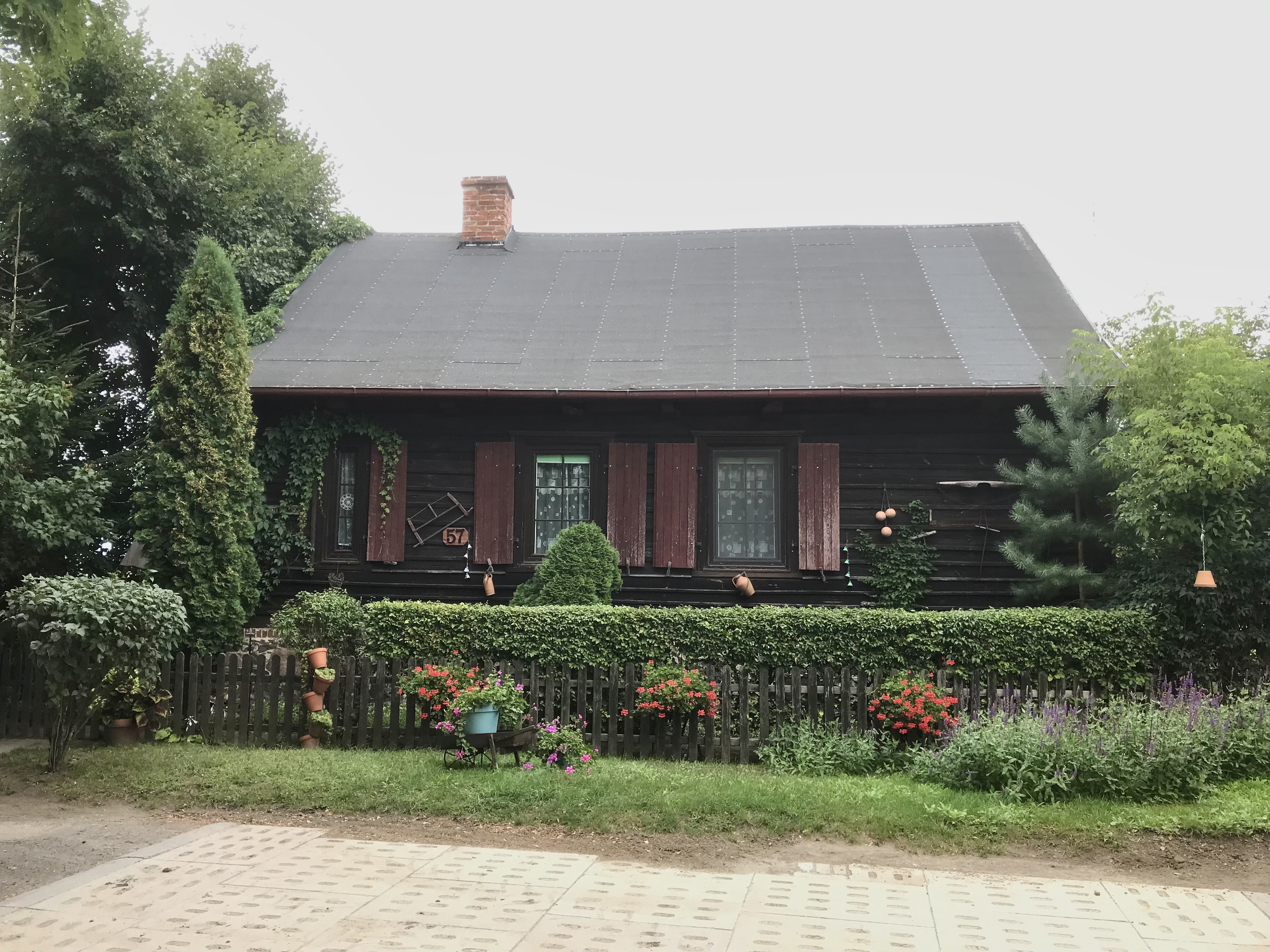
- A traditional timber–framed Kociewian house in Nicponia

- Location within Poland
- Coordinates: 53°49′25″N 18°49′7″E
- Country: Poland
- Voivodeship: Pomeranian
- County: Tczew
- Gmina: Gniew
- Founded: 18th century

Population
  - Total: 742
- Time zone: UTC+1 (CET)
  - Summer (DST): UTC+2 (CEST)
- Vehicle registration: GTC

Nicponia [nit͡sˈpɔɲa] (formerly German: Nichtsfelde) is a village in the administrative district of Gmina Gniew, within Tczew County, Pomeranian Voivodeship, in northern Poland. It is located within the ethnocultural region of Kociewie in the historic region of Pomerania.

== History ==
Founded in the eighteenth century, the first recorded mention of Nicponia appears in written sources around 1790, which refer to the village as Nitzponie.

The village has been regarded as unusual in bucking the national trend for youth emigration from Poland since EU accession.

== Transport ==
A now defunct industrial narrow gauge railway once serviced the village. National road 91 currently runs through Nicponia.

== Notable people ==
- Karol Durski-Trzaska (1849–1935), Polish officer, resided in Nicponia from 1922.

== Gallery ==
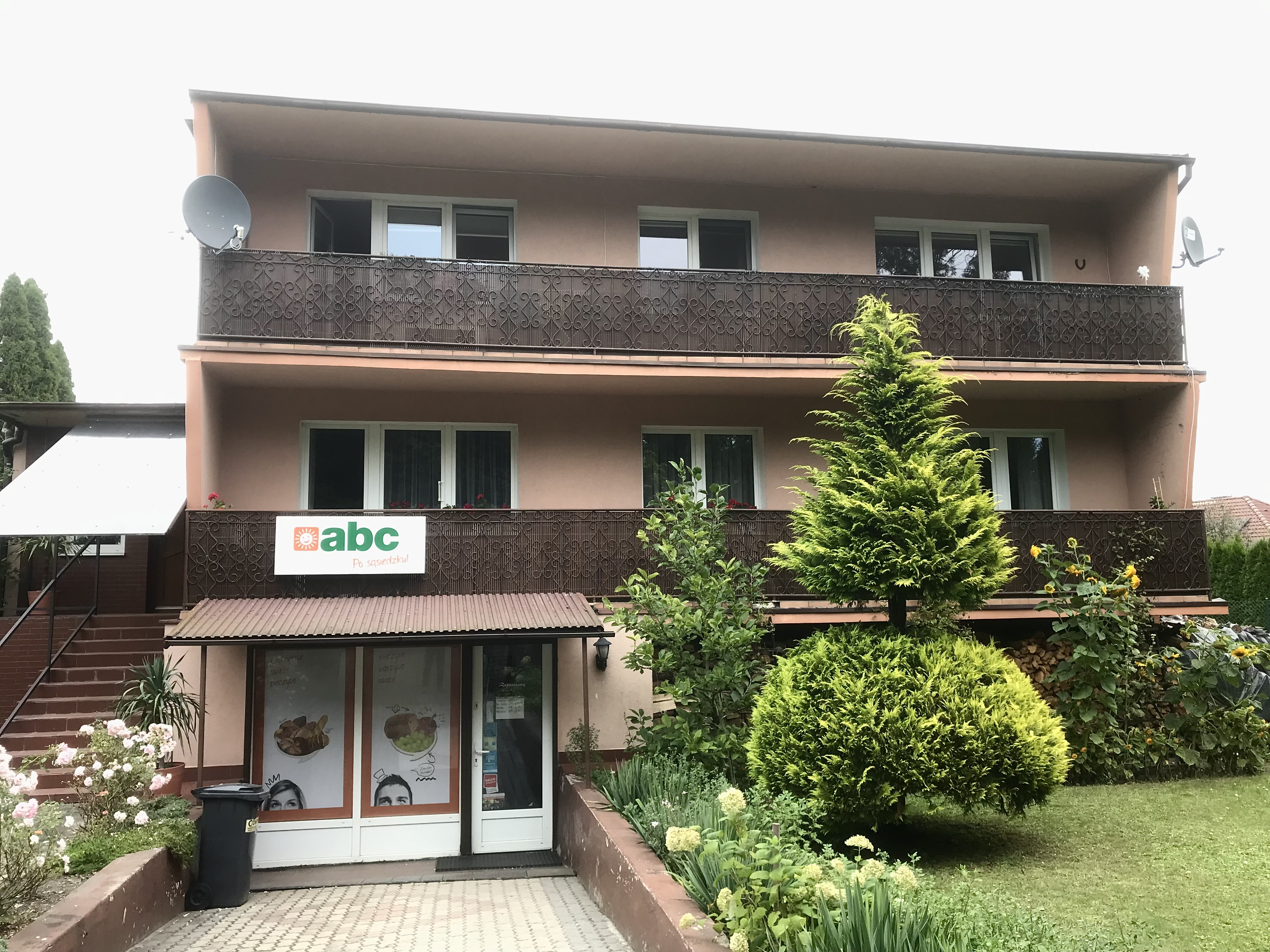
The village shop operated by ABC

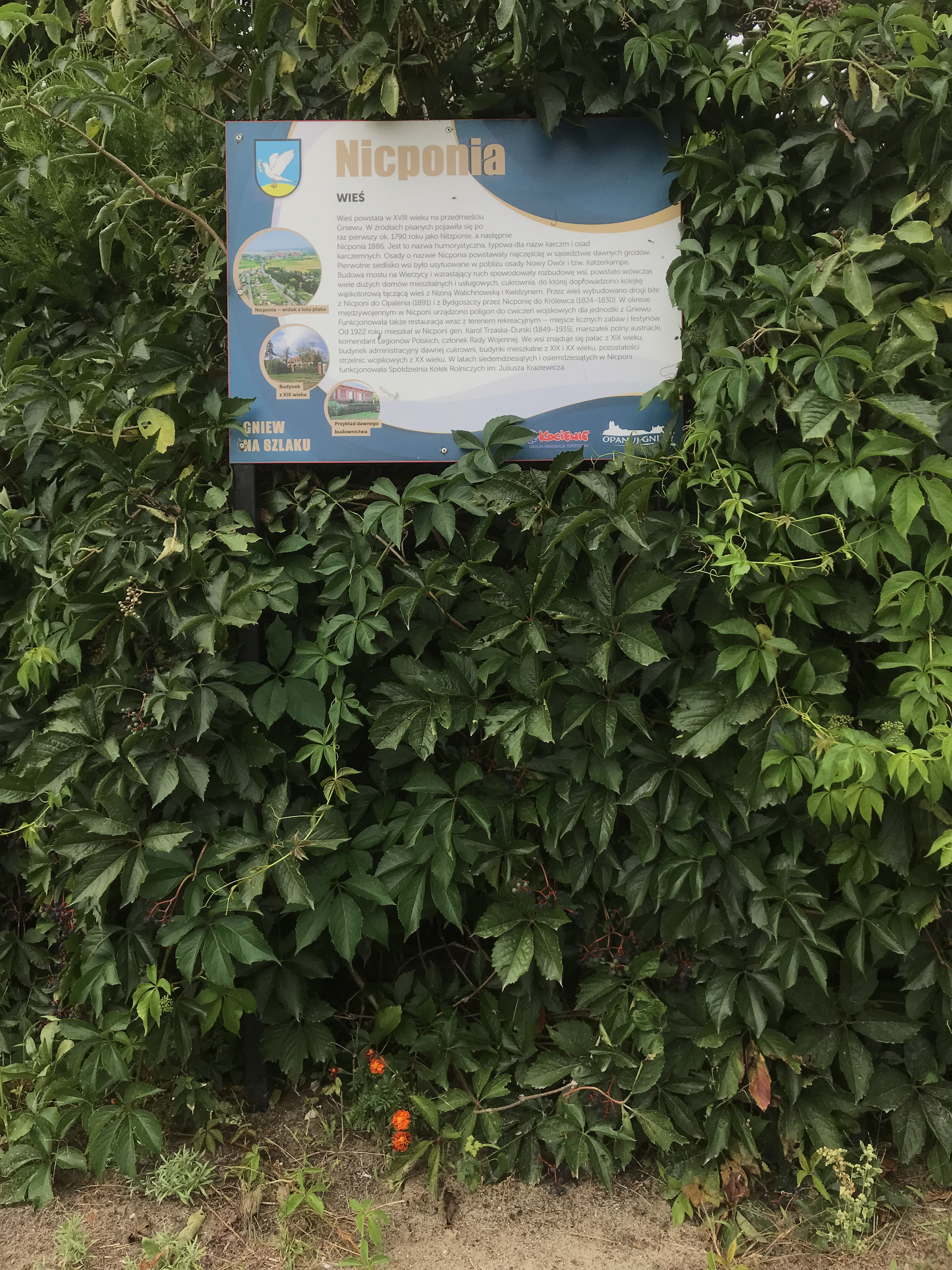
Information board detailing the history of the village
