= Opalenie =

Village in Pomeranian Voivodeship, Poland

- Village
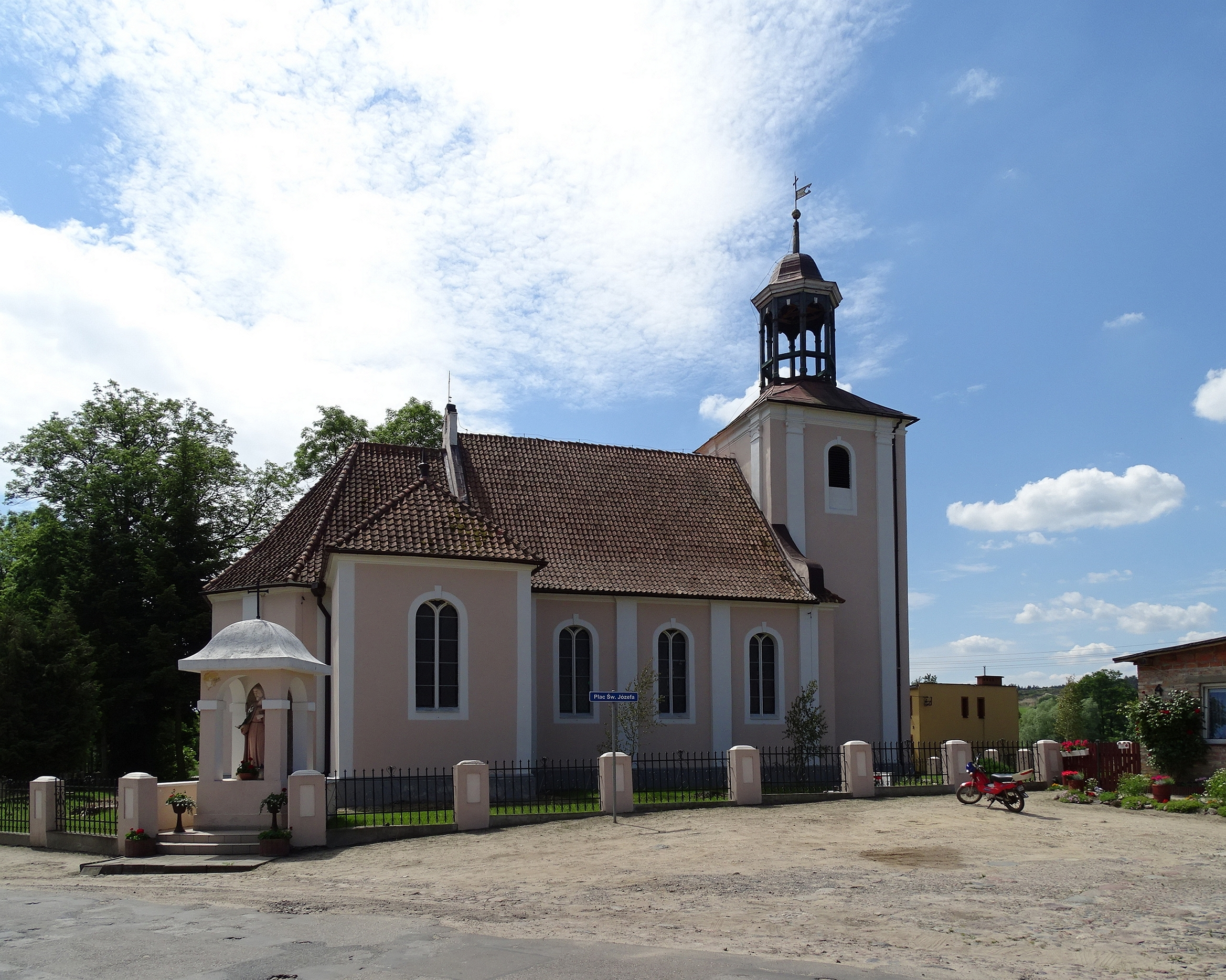
- Church of the Saints Peter and Paul from 1773

- Location within Poland
- Coordinates: 53°44′32″N 18°49′23″E
- Country: Poland
- Voivodeship: Pomeranian
- County: Tczew
- Gmina: Gniew
- Time zone: UTC+1 (CET)
  - Summer (DST): UTC+2 (CEST)
- Vehicle registration: GTC

Opalenie [ɔpaˈlɛɲɛ] is a village in the administrative district of Gmina Gniew, within Tczew County, Pomeranian Voivodeship, in northern Poland. Opalenie is located within the ethnocultural region of Kociewie in the historic region of Pomerania.

== Transport ==
In 2013 a road bridge across the Vistula was opened as part of national road route 90 from Jeleń to Baldram. The bridge, connecting Opalenie to Kwidzyn, is the longest extradosed bridge in Europe and replaced the previous crossing via reaction ferry from Gniew to Janowo.

== History ==
The first mention of the village in historical sources dates back to 1365 in which it was named Opalin. By the 18th century the village and surrounding farmland belonged to the Czapski family. In 1773 the Czapskis commissioned the baroque church of the Saints Peter and Paul.

In 1812 Napoleon Bonaparte spent a night in the village.
