= Duże Wiosło =

Settlement in Poland

- Hamlet
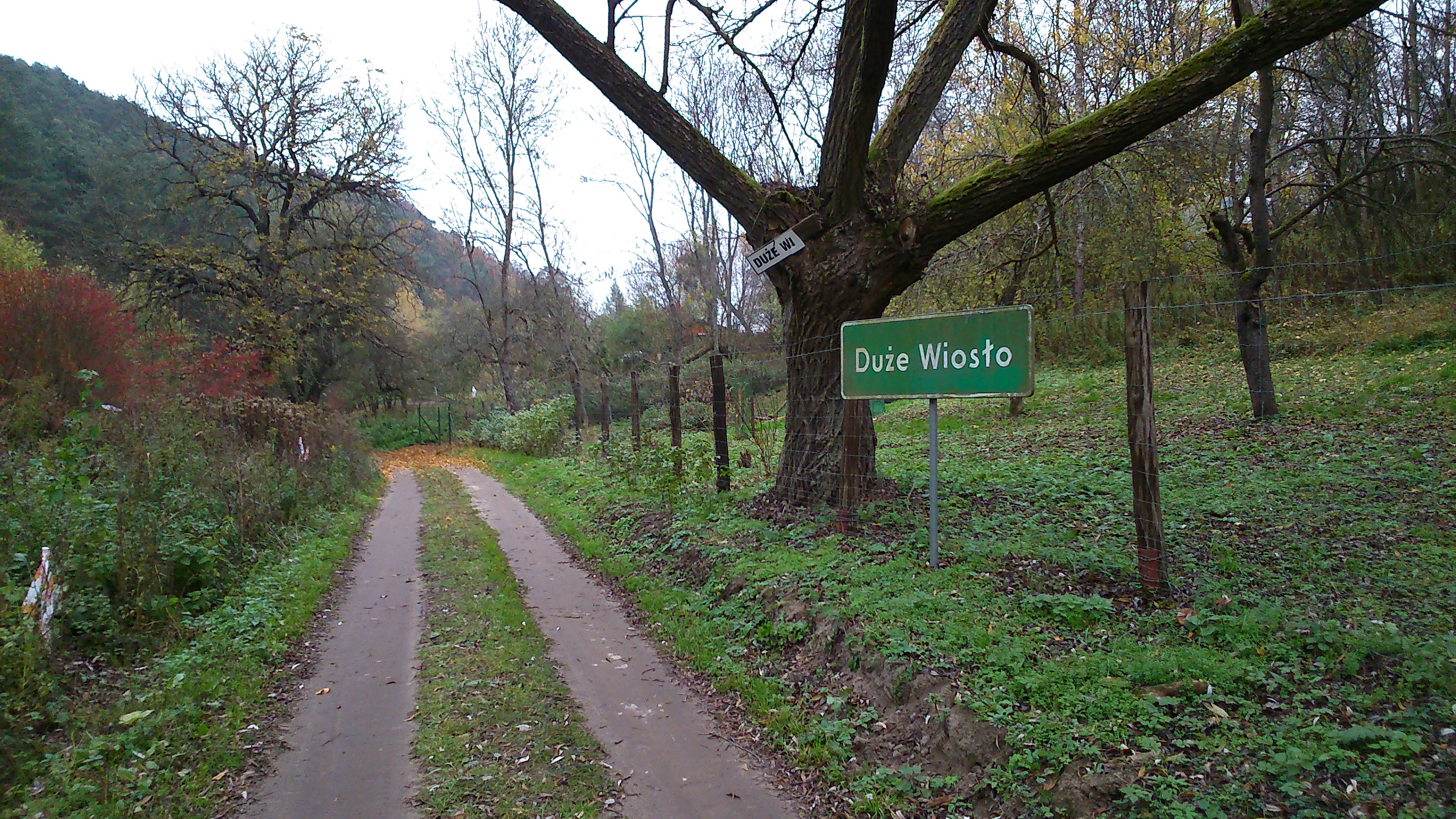

- Location within Poland
- Coordinates: 53°42′35″N 18°47′25″E
- Country: Poland
- Voivodeship: Pomeranian
- County: Tczew
- Gmina: Gniew
- Time zone: UTC+1 (CET)
  - Summer (DST): UTC+2 (CEST)
- Postal code: 83-136
- SIMC: 0161602
- Vehicle registration: GTC

Duże Wiosło is a hamlet in the administrative district of Gmina Gniew, within Tczew County, Pomeranian Voivodeship, in northern Poland. It is located in the ethnocultural region of Kociewie.

In the area of the settlement is a 29.88 ha nature reserve which has rare species including aging chive, dark-red helleborine, large-flowered selfheal, Scorzonera purpurea, globeflower, and Trifolium rubens.
