= Dąbrówka, Tczew County =

Village in Pomeranian Voivodeship, Poland

Dąbrówka
- Village
- Location within Poland
- Coordinates: 53°44′0″N 18°45′5″E
- Country: Poland
- Voivodeship: Pomeranian
- County: Tczew
- Gmina: Gniew

Population
  - Total: 200
- Time zone: UTC+1 (CET)
  - Summer (DST): UTC+2 (CEST)
- Vehicle registration: GTC

Dąbrówka [dɔmˈbrufka] is a village in the administrative district of Gmina Gniew, within Tczew County, Pomeranian Voivodeship, in northern Poland. The village is within the ethnocultural region of Kociewie in the historic region of Pomerania.
