= Aplinki =

Village in Pomeranian Voivodeship, Poland

- Village
- Location within Poland
- Coordinates: 53°45′14″N 18°49′22″E
- Country: Poland
- Voivodeship: Pomeranian
- County: Tczew
- Gmina: Gniew
- Time zone: UTC+1 (CET)
  - Summer (DST): UTC+2 (CEST)
- Postal code: 83-136
- SIMC: 0161335
- Vehicle registration: GTC

Aplinki [aˈplinki] is a village in the administrative district of Gmina Gniew, within Tczew County, Pomeranian Voivodeship, in northern Poland. Aplinki is located in the ethnocultral region of Kociewie in the historic region of Pomerania.
