= Polskie Gronowo =

Village in Pomeranian Voivodeship, Poland

- Village
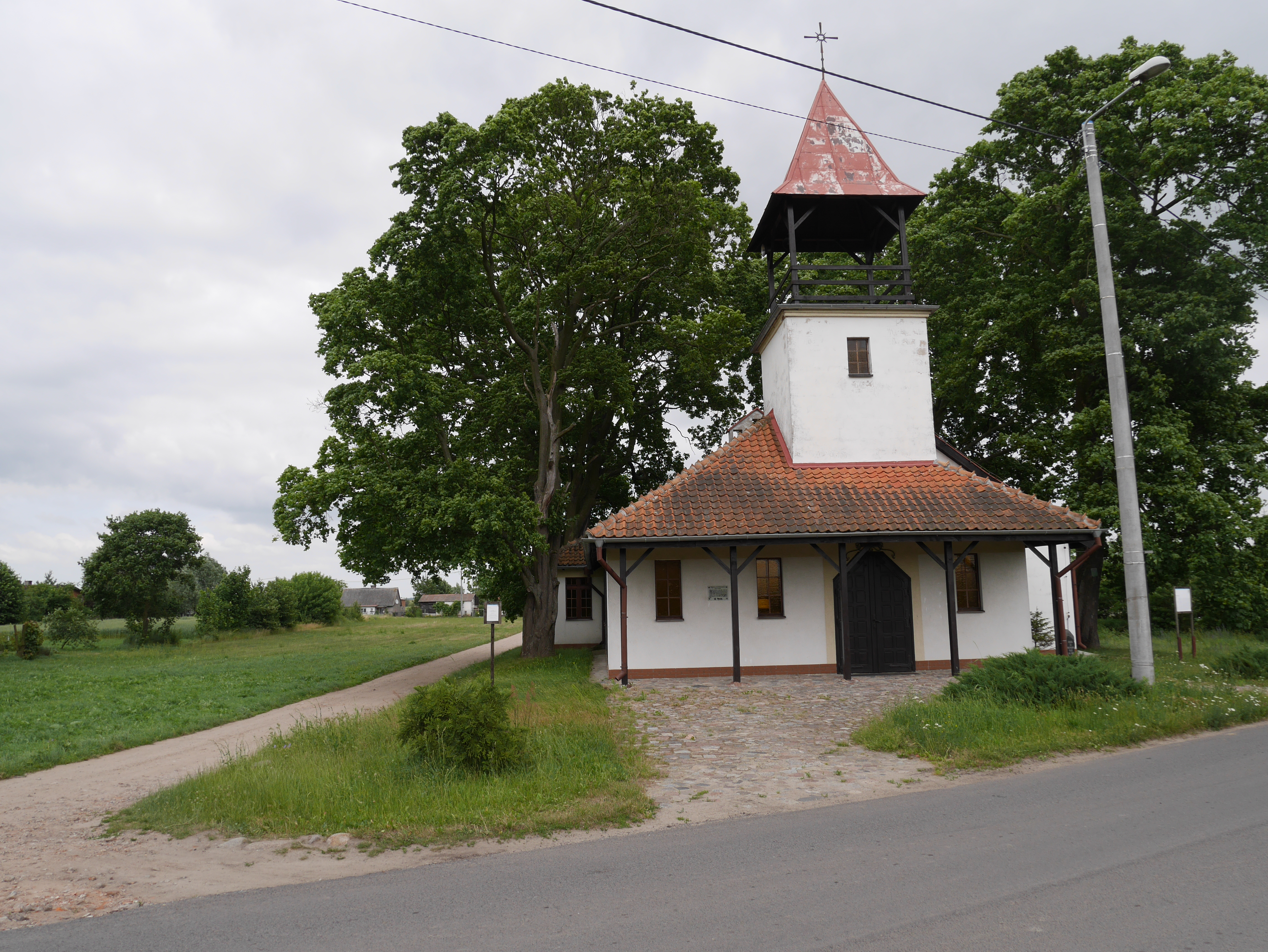
- The village church, 2014

- Location within Poland
- Coordinates: 53°52′56″N 18°50′49″E
- Country: Poland
- Voivodeship: Pomeranian
- County: Tczew
- Gmina: Gniew

Population
  - Total: 379
- Time zone: UTC+1 (CET)
  - Summer (DST): UTC+2 (CEST)
- Vehicle registration: GTC

Polskie Gronowo [ˈpɔlskʲɛ ɡrɔˈnɔvɔ] is a village in the administrative district of Gmina Gniew, within Tczew County, Pomeranian Voivodeship, in northern Poland. It is located in the ethnocultural region of Kociewie in the historic region of Pomerania.
