= Kuchnia, Pomeranian Voivodeship =

Village in Pomeranian Voivodeship, Poland

Kuchnia
- Village
- Location within Poland
- Coordinates: 53°53′35″N 18°52′14″E
- Country: Poland
- Voivodeship: Pomeranian
- County: Tczew
- Gmina: Gniew

Population
  - Total: 144
- Time zone: UTC+1 (CET)
  - Summer (DST): UTC+2 (CEST)
- Vehicle registration: GTC

Kuchnia [ˈkuxɲa] is a village in the administrative district of Gmina Gniew, within Tczew County, Pomeranian Voivodeship, in northern Poland. It is located on the left bank of the Vistula river, within the ethnocultural region of Kociewie in the historic region of Pomerania.

== History ==
During the German occupation of Poland (World War II), in 1941, the Einsatzkompanie Gotenhafen, Schutzpolizei and SS carried out expulsions of Poles, whose houses and farms were then handed over to German colonists as part of the Lebensraum policy. Expelled Poles were enslaved as forced labour and sent either to German colonists in the region or to Germany.
