= Grzegorz Bonin =

Polish footballer (born 1983)

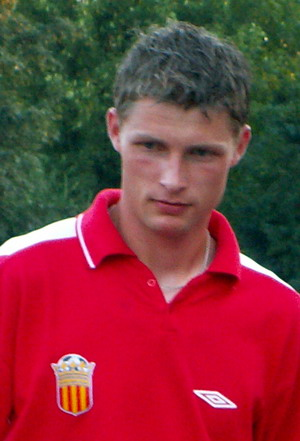
- Bonin with Korona Kielce in 2006

Personal information
- Date of birth: 2 December 1983 (age 42)
- Place of birth: Gniew, Poland
- Height: 1.88 m (6 ft 2 in)
- Position: Winger

Team information
- Current team: Górnik Łęczna (assistant)

Senior career*
| Years | Team | Apps | (Gls) |
| 1999–2001 | Mewa Gniew | | |
| 2001–2003 | Wisła Nowe | | |
| 2004 | Radomiak Radom | 17 | (3) |
| 2005–2008 | Korona Kielce | 93 | (13) |
| 2008–2011 | Górnik Zabrze | 80 | (9) |
| 2011–2012 | Polonia Warsaw | 12 | (0) |
| 2012 | ŁKS Łódź | 12 | (1) |
| 2012 | Pogoń Szczecin | 5 | (1) |
| 2013 | Górnik Zabrze | 15 | (2) |
| 2013–2018 | Górnik Łęczna | 167 | (33) |
| 2018–2019 | Motor Lublin | 47 | (6) |
| 2020 | Lublinianka | 0 | (0) |
| 2020–2023 | Chełmianka Chełm | 73 | (9) |
| 2023 | Granica Lubycza Królewska | 7 | (4) |
| 2024 | Chełmianka Chełm II | 1 | (0) |

International career
| 2006 | Poland | 1 | (0) |

Managerial career
- 2023–2025: Chełmianka Chełm
- 2025–2026: Lewart Lubartów
- * Club domestic league appearances and goals

Grzegorz Bonin (born 2 December 1983) is a Polish professional football manager and former player who played as a winger. He is currently the assistant manager of II liga club Górnik Łęczna.

== Career ==
In January 2013, Bonin joined Górnik Zabrze. On 18 July 2018, he signed a contract with Motor Lublin. Bonin has made one appearance for the Poland national team on 2 May 2006 in a 1–0 loss against Lithuania.

== Managerial statistics ==
As of match played 5 September 2026

Managerial record by team and tenure
| Team | From | To | Record | | | | | | | |
| Team | From | To | G | W | D | L | GF | GA | GD | Win % |
|---|---|---|---|---|---|---|---|---|---|---|
| Chełmianka Chełm | 16 May 2023 | 30 June 2025 | 79 | 37 | 13 | 29 | 170 | 130 | +40 | 46.84 |
| Lewart Lubartów | 6 August 2025 | 7 September 2026 | 42 | 30 | 4 | 8 | 125 | 44 | +81 | 71.43 |
| Total | | | 121 | 67 | 17 | 37 | 295 | 174 | +121 | 55.37 |

== Honours ==
Korona Kielce

- II liga: 2004–05

Chełmianka Chełm

- Polish Cup (Lublin regionals): 2021–22
- Polish Cup (Chełm regionals): 2020–21, 2021–22

Chełmianka Chełm II

- Klasa A Chełm: 2023–24
