= Gniew Castle =

Castle in Poland

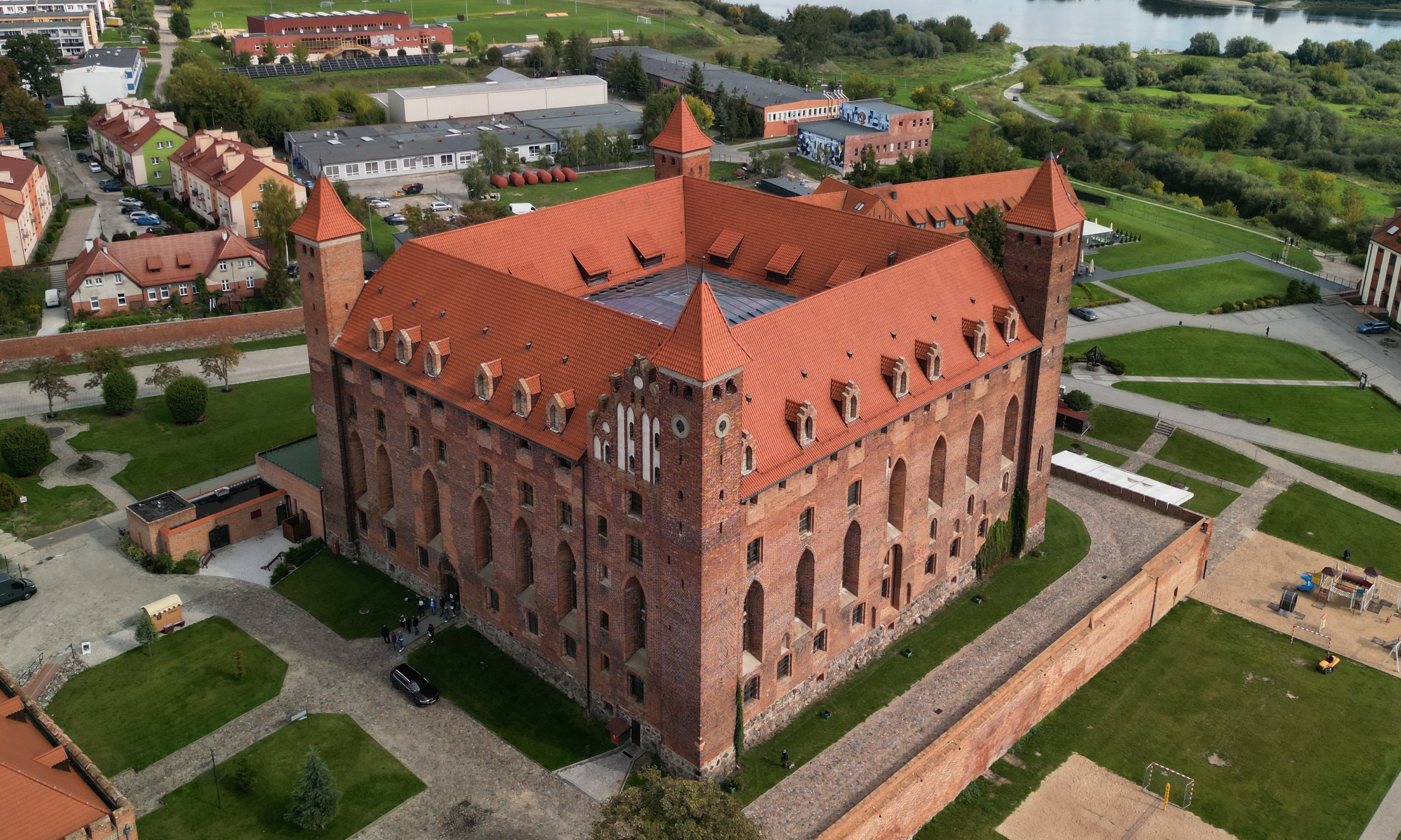

- Location within Poland
- 53°50′03″N 18°49′40″E
- Location: Gniew, Poland

History
- Built: after 1290

Site notes
- Architectural style: Gothic

Gniew Castle is a restored castle in Gniew, in northern Poland. The original building, which served as a defensive structure for the Teutonic Order on the Vistula river, dates back to the late 13th or 14th century.

== History ==
The structure, a Gothic ordensburg castle, is a former castle of the Teutonic Order, built after 1290. By the Second Peace of Toruń (1466) Gniew once again became Polish and the castle was given to nobleman Jan de Jani of the Clan of Ostoja, the voivode of Pomerania by the Polish King. It has been expanded and rebuilt several times since. Within the Kingdom of Poland, it served as the seat of the starosts of Gniew, including its most famous resident future King John III Sobieski, who built the adjacent Baroque palace for his wife Marie Casimire Louise de La Grange d'Arquien.

It was destroyed by a fire in 1921 and was reconstructed in its current form between 1968 and 1974.

== See also ==
- Castles in Poland
