= Gogolewo, Tczew County =

Village in Pomeranian Voivodeship, Poland

Gogolewo
- Village
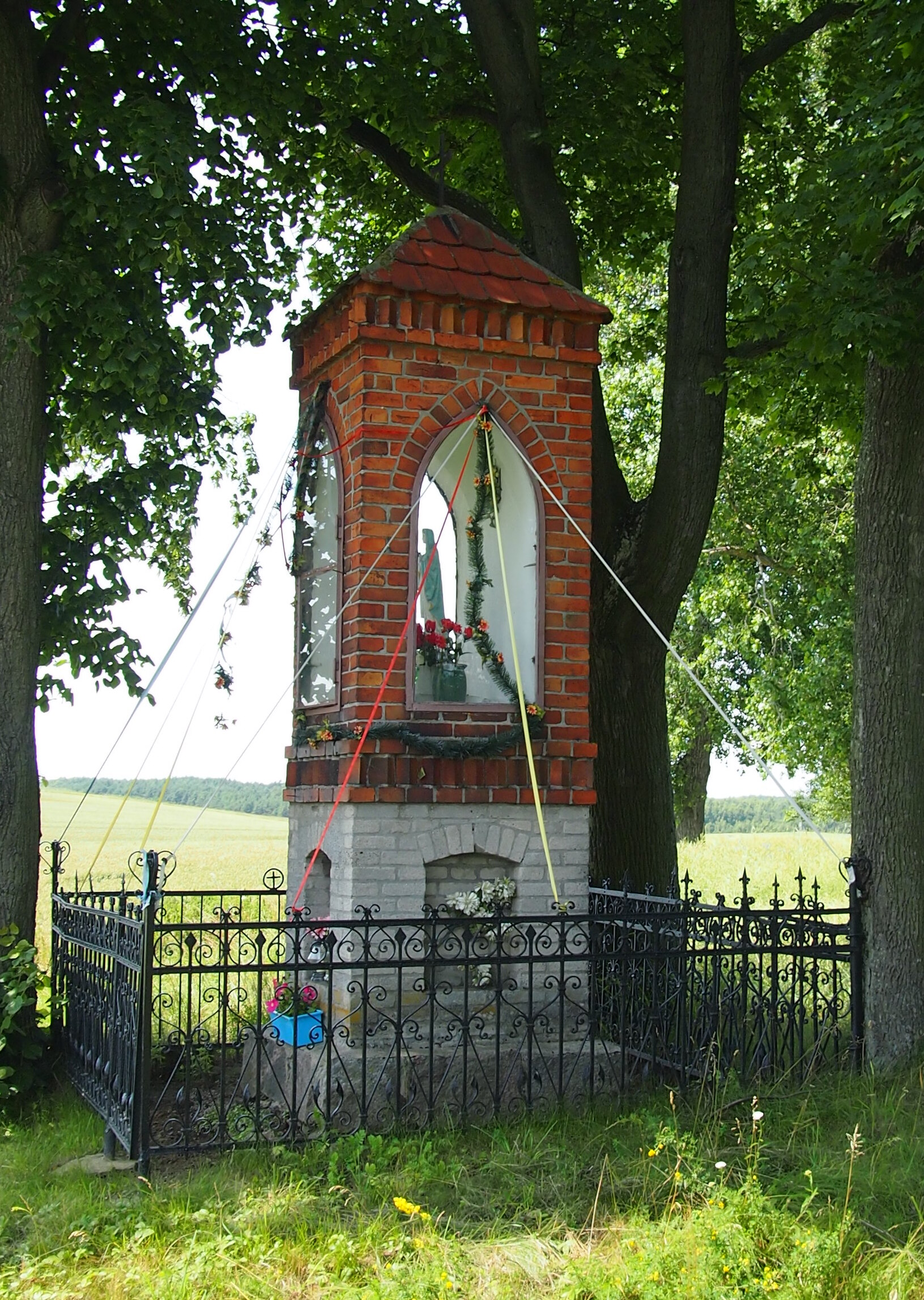
- A kapliczka in the village, 2013

- Location within Poland
- Coordinates: 53°49′50″N 18°46′22″E
- Country: Poland
- Voivodeship: Pomeranian
- County: Tczew
- Gmina: Gniew

Population
  - Total: 389
- Time zone: UTC+1 (CET)
  - Summer (DST): UTC+2 (CEST)
- Vehicle registration: GTC

Gogolewo [ɡɔɡɔˈlɛvɔ] is a village in the administrative district of Gmina Gniew, within Tczew County, Pomeranian Voivodeship, in northern Poland. It is located within the ethnocultural region of Kociewie in the historic region of Pomerania.

Gogolewo was a private church village of the Diocese of Włocławek, administratively located in the Tczew County in the Pomeranian Voivodeship of the Kingdom of Poland.
