= Włosienica, Pomeranian Voivodeship =

Village in Pomeranian Voivodeship, Poland

Włosienica
- Village
- Location within Poland
- Coordinates: 53°41′58″N 18°42′34″E
- Country: Poland
- Voivodeship: Pomeranian
- County: Tczew
- Gmina: Gniew

Population
  - Total: 102
- Time zone: UTC+1 (CET)
  - Summer (DST): UTC+2 (CEST)
- Vehicle registration: GTC

Włosienica [vwɔɕɛˈnit͡sa] is a village in the administrative district of Gmina Gniew, within Tczew County, Pomeranian Voivodeship, in northern Poland. It is located in the ethnocultural region of Kociewie in the historical region of Pomerania.
