= Wielkie Wyręby =

Village in Pomeranian Voivodeship, Poland

- Village
- Location within Poland
- Coordinates: 53°46′57″N 18°42′25″E
- Country: Poland
- Voivodeship: Pomeranian
- County: Tczew
- Gmina: Gniew

Population
  - Total: 110
- Time zone: UTC+1 (CET)
  - Summer (DST): UTC+2 (CEST)
- Vehicle registration: GTC

Wielkie Wyręby [ˈvjɛlkʲɛ vɨˈrɛmbɨ] is a village in the administrative district of Gmina Gniew, within Tczew County, Pomeranian Voivodeship, in northern Poland. It is located in the ethnocultural region of Kociewie in the historical region of Pomerania.
