= Ostrowite, Gmina Gniew =

Village in Pomeranian Voivodeship, Poland

Ostrowite
- Village
- Location within Poland
- Coordinates: 53°43′27″N 18°43′31″E
- Country: Poland
- Voivodeship: Pomeranian
- County: Tczew
- Gmina: Gniew

Population
  - Total: 182
- Time zone: UTC+1 (CET)
  - Summer (DST): UTC+2 (CEST)
- Vehicle registration: GTC

Ostrowite [ɔstrɔˈvitɛ] is a village in the administrative district of Gmina Gniew, within Tczew County, Pomeranian Voivodeship, in northern Poland. The village is located within the ethnocultural region of Kociewie in the historic region of Pomerania.
