= Stary Młyn, Tczew County =

Village in Pomeranian Voivodeship, Poland

Stary Młyn
- Village
- Location within Poland
- Coordinates: 53°44′20″N 18°44′28″E
- Country: Poland
- Voivodeship: Pomeranian
- County: Tczew
- Gmina: Gniew

Population
  - Total: 90
- Time zone: UTC+1 (CET)
  - Summer (DST): UTC+2 (CEST)
- Vehicle registration: GTC

Stary Młyn [ˈstarɨ ˈmwɨn] is a village in the administrative district of Gmina Gniew, within Tczew County, Pomeranian Voivodeship, in northern Poland. It is located in the ethnocultural region of Kociewie in the historic region of Pomerania.
