= Jaźwiska =

Village in Pomeranian Voivodeship, Poland

- Village
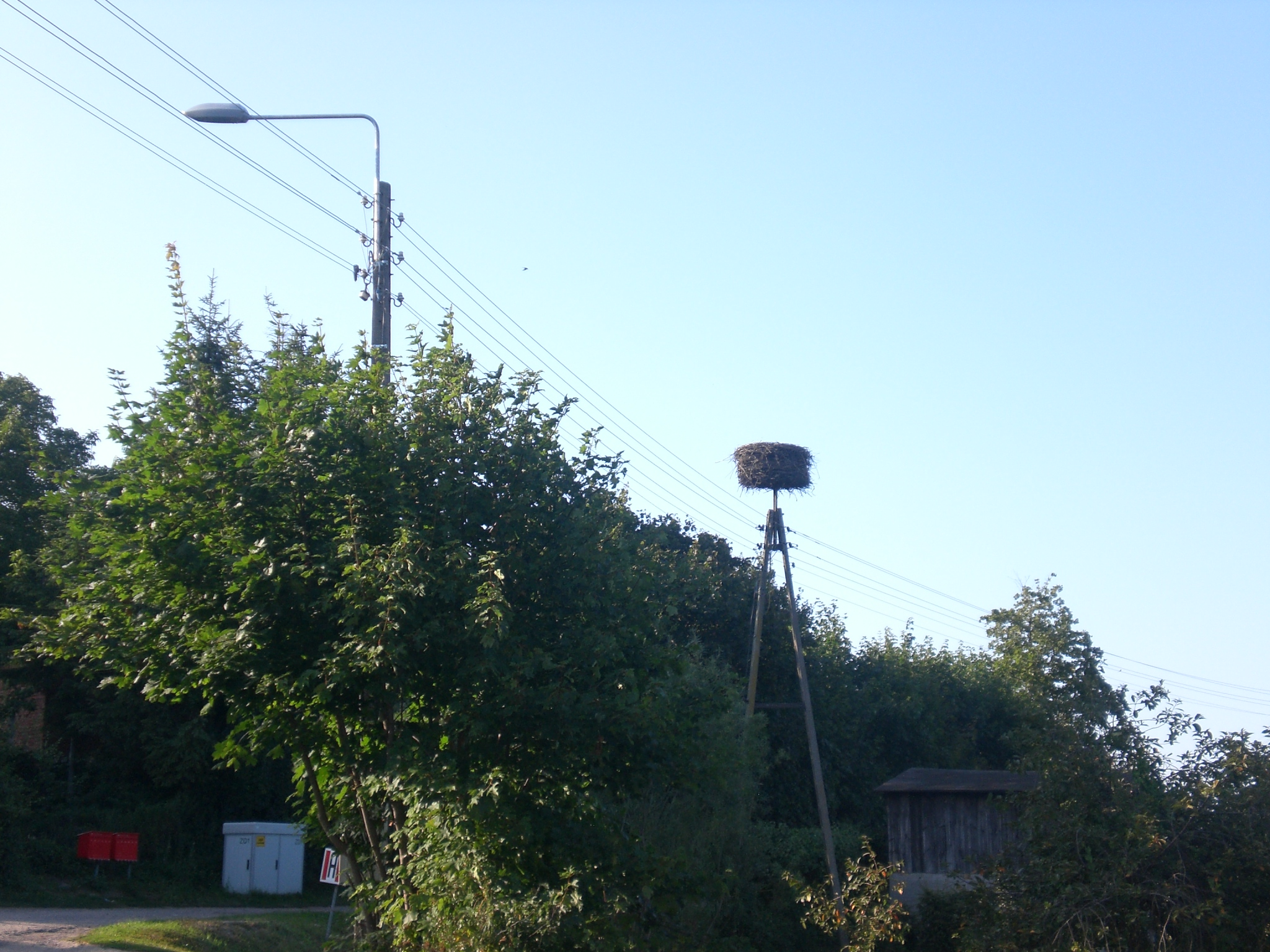
- A white stork’s nest atop a pylon in the village

- Location within Poland
- Coordinates: 53°46′38″N 18°49′55″E
- Country: Poland
- Voivodeship: Pomeranian
- County: Tczew
- Gmina: Gniew

Population
  - Total: 466
- Time zone: UTC+1 (CET)
  - Summer (DST): UTC+2 (CEST)
- Vehicle registration: GTC

Jaźwiska [jaʑˈviska] is a village in the administrative district of Gmina Gniew, within Tczew County, Pomeranian Voivodeship, in northern Poland. Jaźwiska lies in the ethnocultural region of Kociewie in the historic region of Pomerania.
