= Tymawa, Pomeranian Voivodeship =

Village in Pomeranian Voivodeship, Poland

Tymawa
- Village
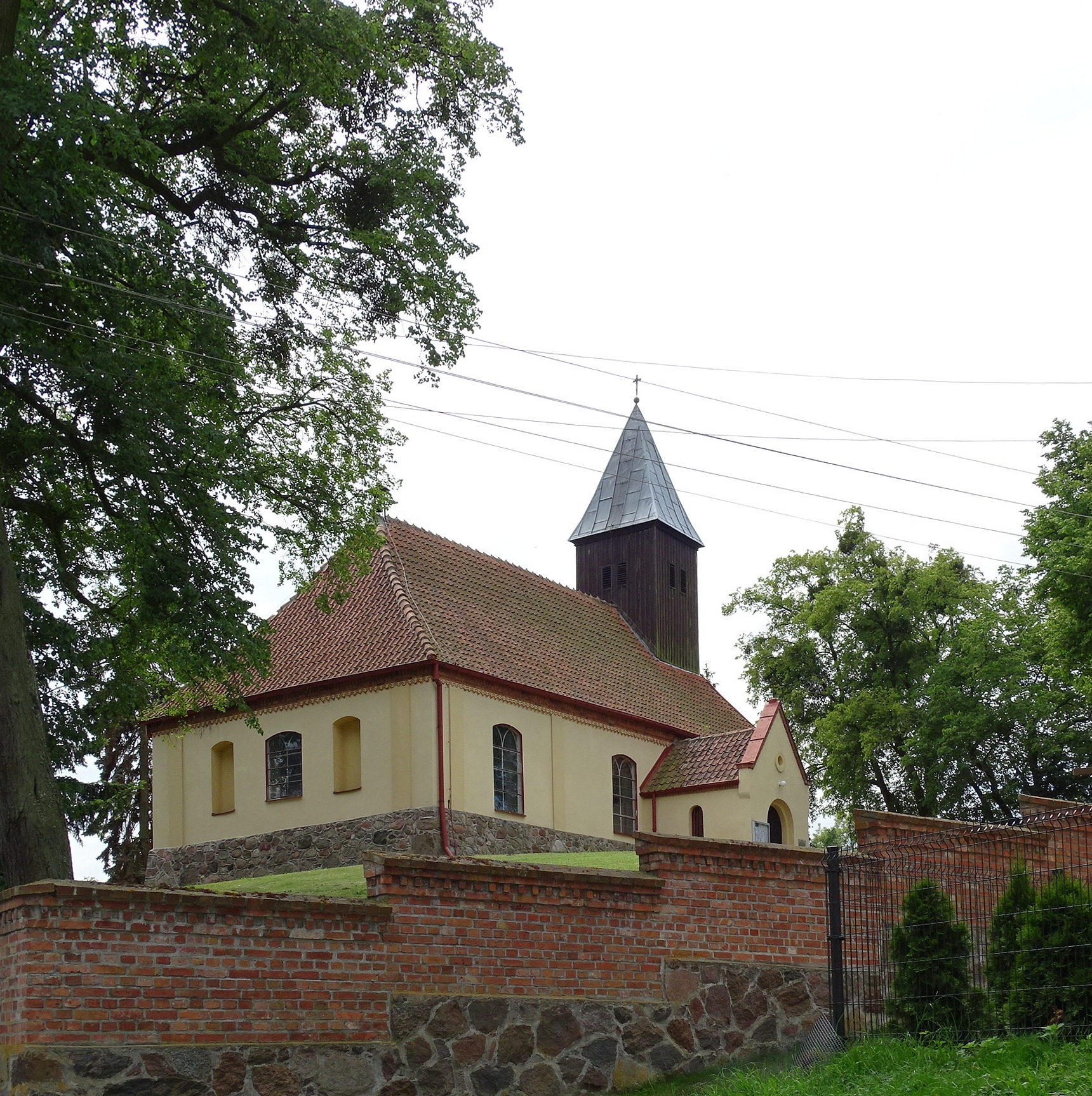
- Church of Saint Michael from the 17th century

- Location within Poland
- Coordinates: 53°47′54″N 18°48′45″E
- Country: Poland
- Voivodeship: Pomeranian
- County: Tczew
- Gmina: Gniew
- Time zone: UTC+1 (CET)
  - Summer (DST): UTC+2 (CEST)
- Vehicle registration: GTC

Tymawa [tɨˈmava] is a village in the administrative district of Gmina Gniew, within Tczew County, Pomeranian Voivodeship, in northern Poland. It is located within the ethnocultural region of Kociewie in the historic region of Pomerania.

== History ==
The village was given to the Order of Calatrava for protection against the Prussians in 1227. But they did not hold it for long and abandoned the endeavour by 1245.

Tymawa was a royal village of the Polish Crown, administratively located in the Tczew County in the Pomeranian Voivodeship. During the Reformation, the local church briefly passed to Protestants, however, in 1596 it was restored to Catholics by Bishop Hieronim Rozdrażewski. In 1632, King Władysław IV Vasa confirmed the possession of six włókas of land by the local sołtys. In 1780, the village was inhabited by 206 Catholics and two non-Catholics. In 1885, it had a population of 455.

During the German occupation of Poland (World War II), in 1939, the local Polish parish priest was murdered by the Germans during large massacres of Poles in the Szpęgawski Forest, and in 1941, the Einsatzkompanie Gotenhafen, Schutzpolizei and SS carried out expulsions of Polish farmers, who were then enslaved as forced labour and sent either to German colonists in the region or to Germany, while their farms were handed over to German colonists as part of the Lebensraum policy.
