= Małe Wiosło =

Settlement in Poland

- Hamlet
- Location within Poland
- Coordinates: 53°42′44″N 18°47′37″E
- Country: Poland
- Voivodeship: Pomeranian
- County: Tczew
- Gmina: Gniew
- Time zone: UTC+1 (CET)
  - Summer (DST): UTC+2 (CEST)
- Postal code: 83-136
- SIMC: 0161619
- Vehicle registration: GTC

Małe Wiosło is a hamlet in the administrative district of Gmina Gniew, within Tczew County, Pomeranian Voivodeship, in northern Poland. It is located in the ethnocultural region of Kociewie.

Administratively, the settlement forms part of the larger village of Widlice. In 2019 new facilities were opened in the hamlet as part of the local nature reserve.
