= Gniew =

Town in Poland

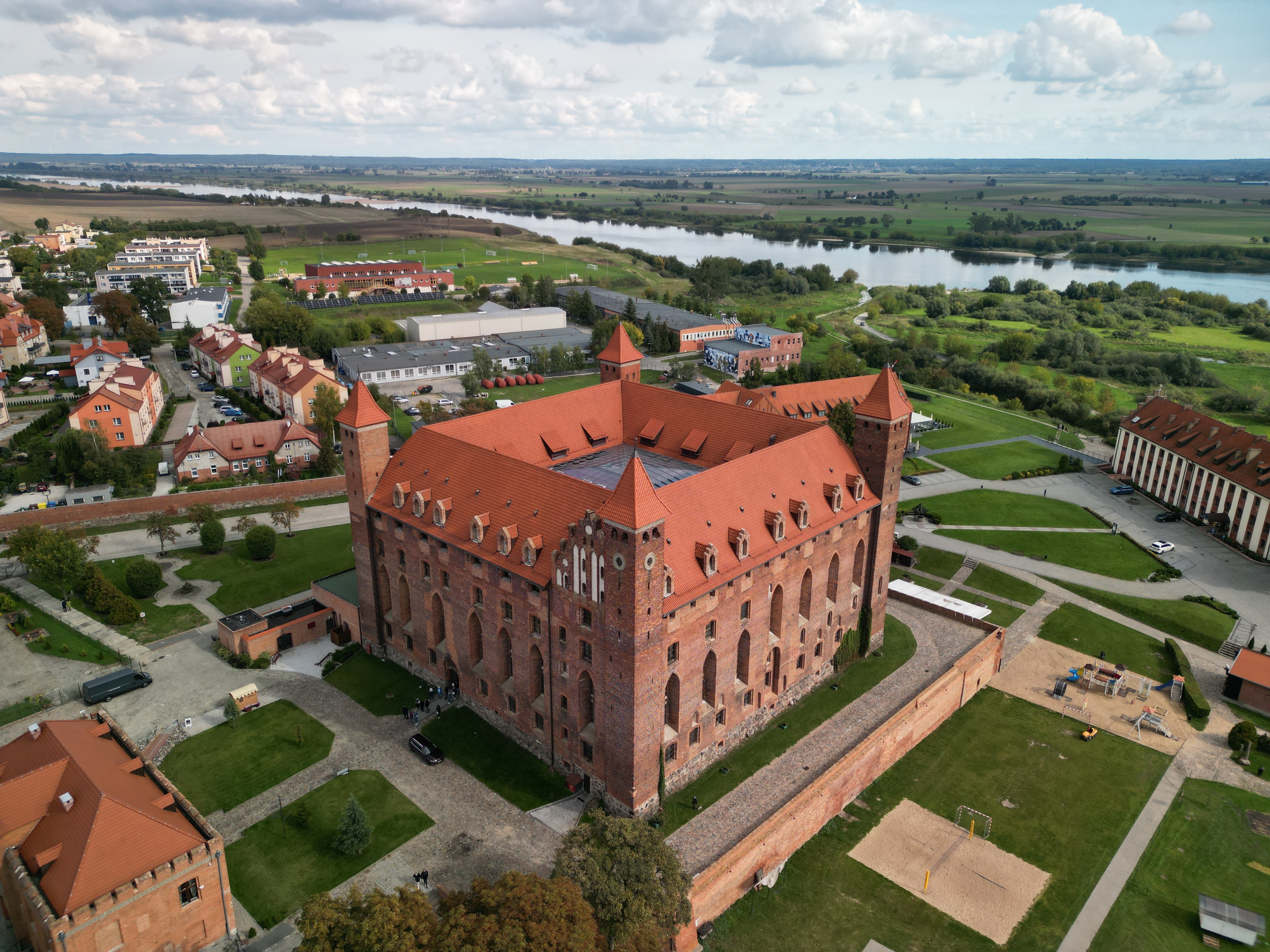
- Gniew Castle

- Flag Coat of arms

- Location within Poland
- Coordinates: 53°50′10″N 18°49′25″E
- Country: Poland
- Voivodeship: Pomeranian
- County: Tczew
- Gmina: Gniew
- Established: 13th century
- Town rights: 1297

Government
  - Mayor: Maciej Czarnecki

Area
  - Total: 6.75 km^{2} (2.61 sq mi)
- Elevation: 47 m (154 ft)

Population (2016)
  - Total: 6,870
  - Density: 1,020/km^{2} (2,640/sq mi)
- Time zone: UTC+1 (CET)
  - Summer (DST): UTC+2 (CEST)
- Postal code: 83-140
- Area code: +48 58
- Car plates: GTC
- Website: http://www.gniew.pl

Gniew [ɡɲɛf] (Note: German: Mewe) is a historic town situated on the left bank of the Vistula River, in the Pomeranian Voivodeship, in northern Poland. It has 6,870 inhabitants (2016).

It is one of the oldest towns in Eastern Pomerania, and is renowned for its medieval Brick Gothic Castle, which has become one of the region's most recognizable monuments. The town also has other medieval Gothic monuments, and in early modern times it was a centre for the wine trade and the seat of local starosts, most notably John III Sobieski, who was elected King of Poland. Gniew is located in the ethnocultural region of Kociewie in the historic region of Pomerania.

== History ==
The first recorded mentions of Gniew appear in written documents of the first half of the 13th century, which refer to the region as Terra Gymeu (Gmewan, Gimen, Gymen) in 1229, terra Mewe in 1250, and terra Gemewe in 1283, terra Mewa. The name Gniew is of native, Polish origin. The name Wansca (Wońsk) was also used. The German name of Mewe is a Germanized form of the Polish name Gmewe. The town's coat of arms is an example of canting, as it depicts a seagull (German: Möwe), which alludes to the town's Germanized name.

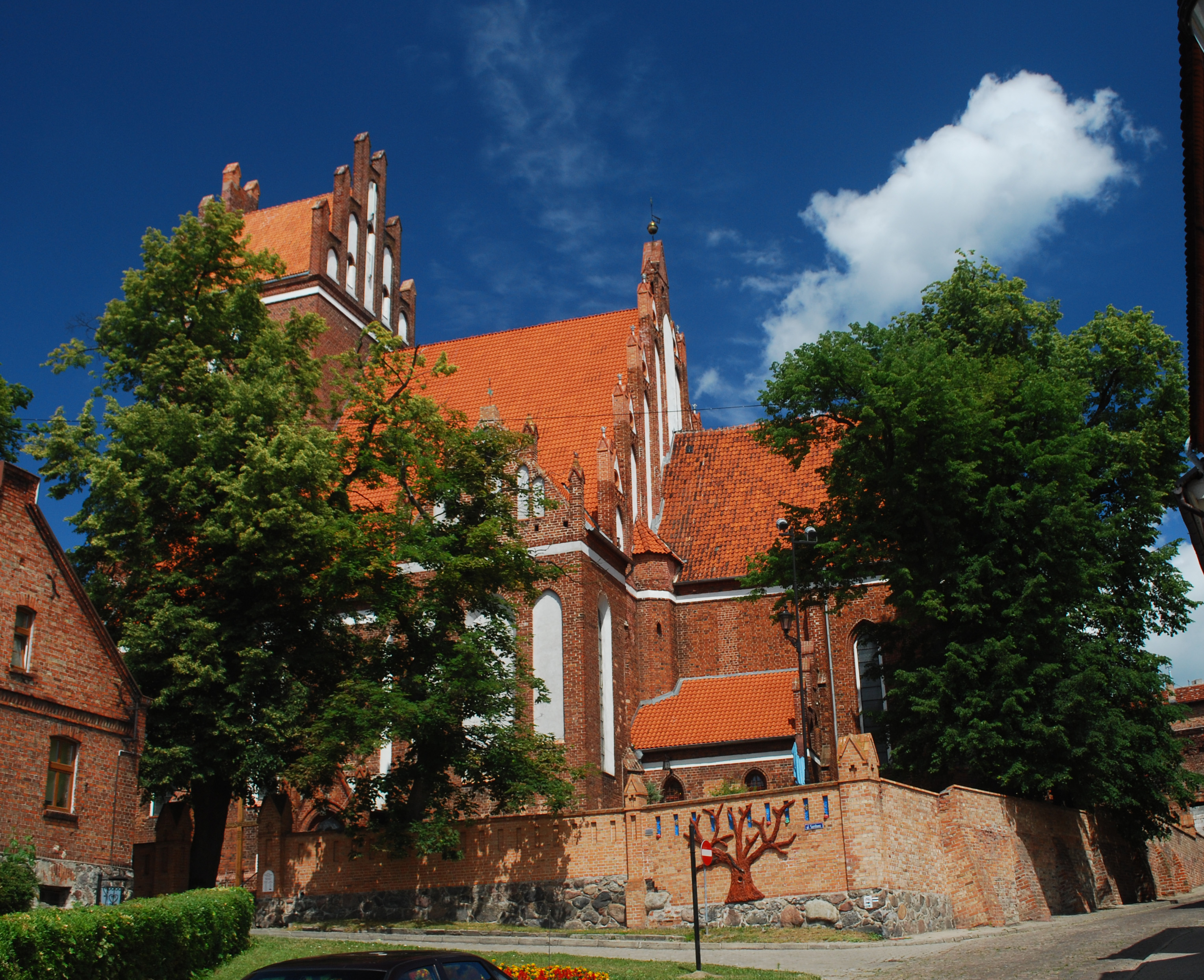
Saint Nicholas church

Beginning in the 10th century, the region belonged to Poland and was part of Gdańsk Pomerania. After the division of Poland by Bolesław III Wrymouth, Gniew fell to the castellany of Starogard. The land later fell to the Dukes of Świecie and in 1229 Duke Sambor and Świętopełk II of Pomerania granted it to the Cistercian abbey in Oliwa. In the second half of the 13th century, Sambor retook Gniew from the Cistercians and in 1276 bestowed it on the Teutonic Knights. Their claim was formally recognized by Mestwin II of Pomerania in 1282, and the city became the first stronghold of the Teutonic Order on the left riverside of the Vistula. A castle was built as a result of this important strategic location, and in 1297 the Teutonic Knights gave Gniew town privileges. In 1306, the town returned to Poland, and several years later it was occupied by Teutonic Knights.

The town changed hands various times between 1410 and 1466. In 1440, it joined the anti-Teutonic Prussian Confederation, and upon its request it was re-incorporated to Poland by King Casimir IV Jagiellon in 1454, which was confirmed in the Second Peace of Toruń in 1466. Administratively, it was part of the Pomeranian Voivodeship in the Polish province of Royal Prussia, later also in the Greater Poland Province. Gniew was the seat of the starosts (local district governors), they resided in the Gniew castle. In 1454 Gniew was temporarily the first seat of the Polish voivodes of Pomerania. In 1626, during the Swedish-Polish War, a battle between the Polish–Lithuanian Commonwealth and Swedish forces was fought in the area of Gniew, resulting in a (formal) victory for the army of King Gustavus Adolphus of Sweden, though the battle was unresolved.

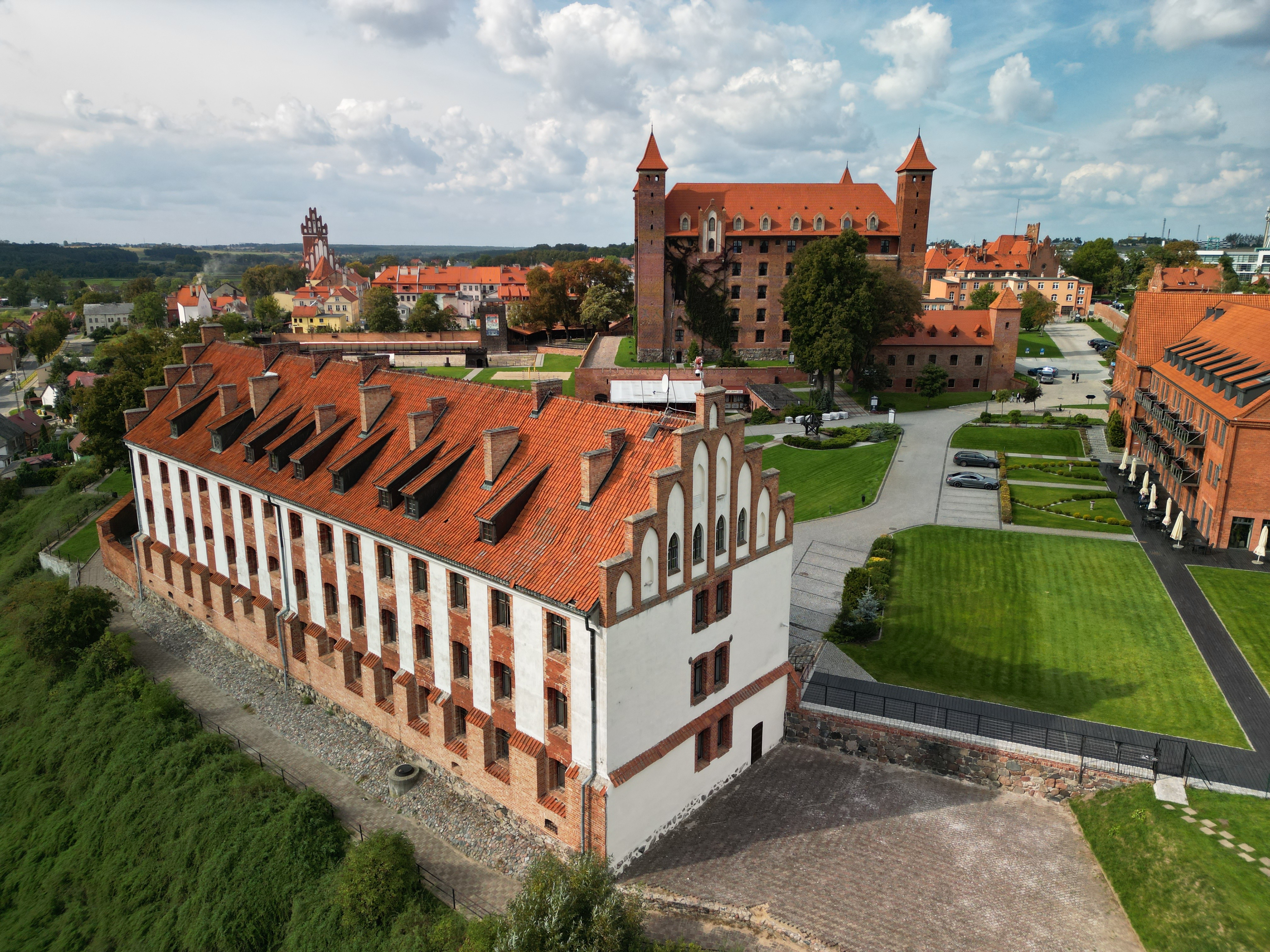
Part of the Castle which belonged to Queen Marie Casimire of Poland

In the second half of the 17th century, prior to becoming King of Poland, John III Sobieski served as the starost of Gniew and built the "Marysieńka Palace" for his wife, Queen Marie Casimire.

Gniew was annexed by the Kingdom of Prussia during the Partitions of Poland and became part of the German Empire in 1871. During the Napoleonic Wars, General Jan Henryk Dąbrowski spent four months in Gniew for medical treatment. In November 1831, several Polish cavalry units of the November Uprising stopped near the town on the way to their internment places. During the partition period, the population was subjected to Germanisation policies, however, Gniew was a strong Polish pro-independence centre. Polish organisations were established and operated here, demonstrations were held and volunteers were secretly recruited for the January Uprising in the Russian Partition. In 1906–1907, local Polish children joined the children school strikes against Germanisation that spread throughout the Prussian Partition of Poland. With the defeat of Imperial Germany in World War I, Gniew became the capital of the short lived Republic of Gniew before becoming part of the restored Poland according to the Treaty of Versailles. This date is celebrated in Gniew till today as the anniversary of liberation from Prussian oppression and the end of 148 years of attempts to eradicate its Polish past.

Gniew in the 1930s

After the First World War, the number of ethnic Germans in the town decreased. During the first few months of World War II and the German occupation of Poland many of the Polish residents of Gniew and the surrounding area were killed by Germans in the nearby Forest of Szpęgawsk. Gniew castle was used by Nazi Germany as a prison for the ethnically cleansed Polish population of Tczew and the surrounding area. In November 1939, the Germans carried out the first expulsions of some 600 Poles from Gniew. Several local Polish policemen were murdered by the Russians in the Katyn massacre in 1940.

== Culture ==
=== Popular culture ===
Gniew was the setting for the location of the fictional town of Trulocz in the film Colors of Evil: Black.

== Main sights ==
Grunwald Square with the town hall (Ratusz)

The most notable landmark of the town is the Ordensburg castle built by the Teutonic Order at the turn of the 14th century, which later served as the seat of the local starosts, as well as Marysienka's Palace, built during the second half of the 17th century. The town also boasts a well preserved medieval old town, with buildings dating from the 15th to 19th century and a Gothic church dating to the 14th century.

== Sport ==
The town is represented by the lower league football club Mewa Gniew who play at the GOSiR stadium. Local football teams Keramzyt Szprudowo and Piast Piaseczno also share the ground.

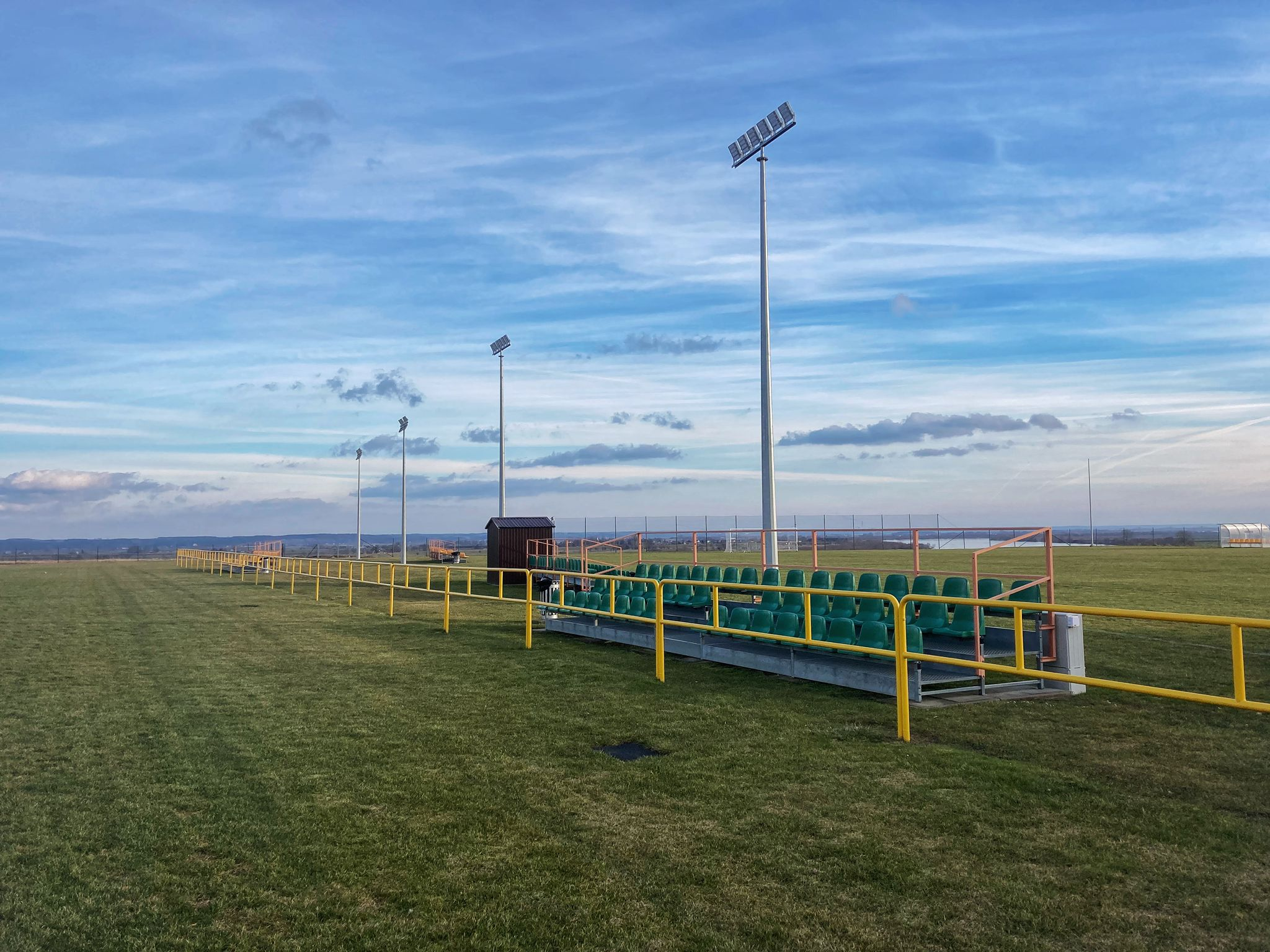
Seating area of the Gminny Ośrodek Sportu i Rekreacji w Gniewie (GOSiR)

== Transport ==
Gniew lies on the route of national road 91 and is served by voivodeship roads 234 and 518. Until the opening of the river crossing at Opalenie in 2013, a reaction ferry connected Gniew to Janowo on road 510. Prior to WWI the town was connected by railway to Kwidzyn via a Train ferry. Gniew railway station closed in 1992 and the town is no longer connected to the national network.

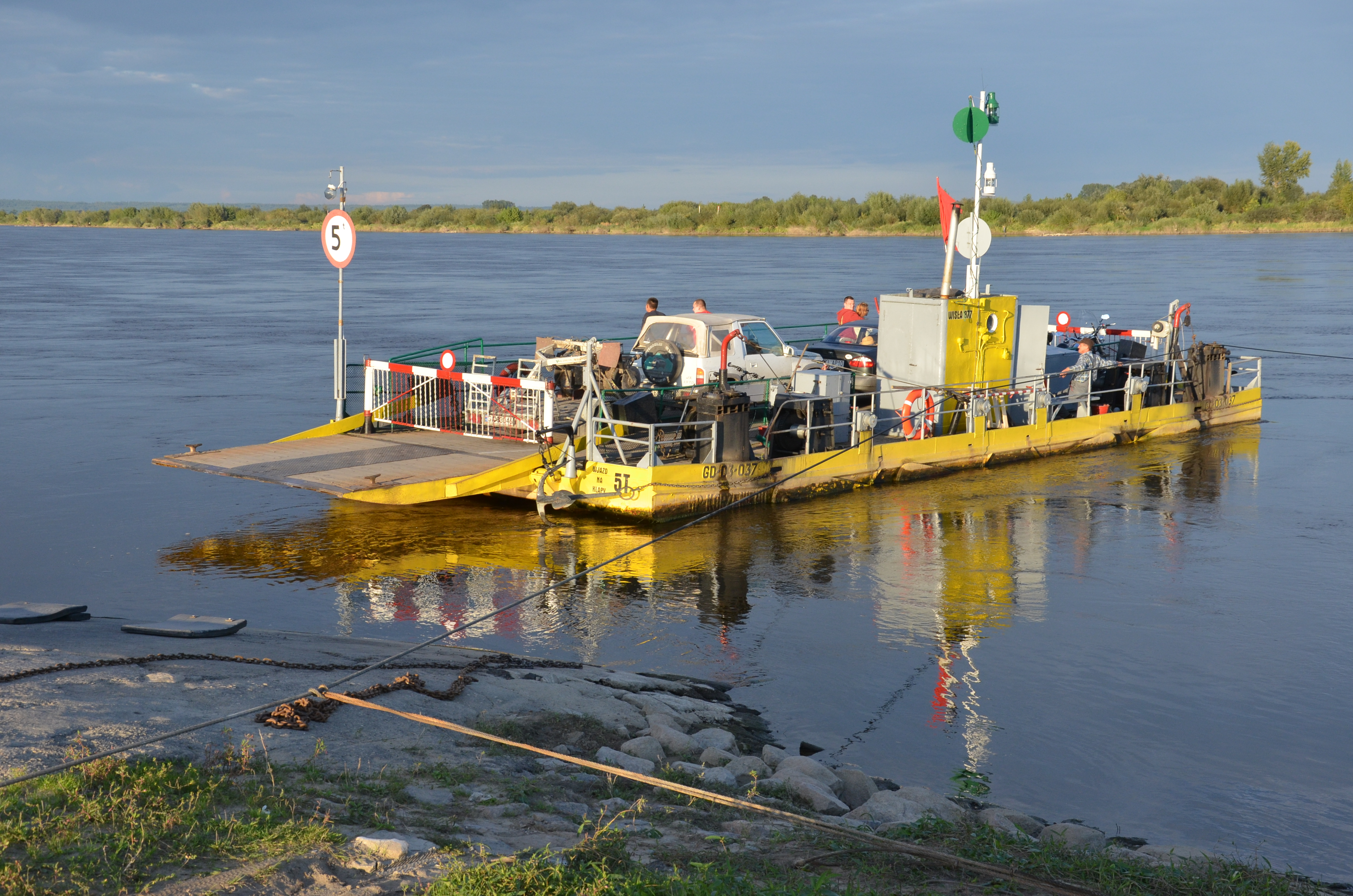
The reaction ferry crossing the Vistula at Gniew

== Notable people ==
- Ezekiel Caro (1844 – 1915), worked as rabbi to the Jewish community in the town
- Leon Wyczółkowski (1852–1936), Realist painter of the Young Poland movement, was a resident of the town from 1928
- Iwan Knorr (1853–1916), German composer and teacher of music
- Paul Radomski (1902-1945), German war criminal
- Christa Lörcher (born 1941), former German politician
- Grzegorz Bonin (born 1983), Polish footballer

== International relations ==
Gniew is twinned with:

- Castelmassa, Italy
- Ovidiopol, Ukraine
- Pelplin, Poland
