= Jeleń, Pomeranian Voivodeship =

Village in Pomeranian Voivodeship, Poland

Jeleń
- Village
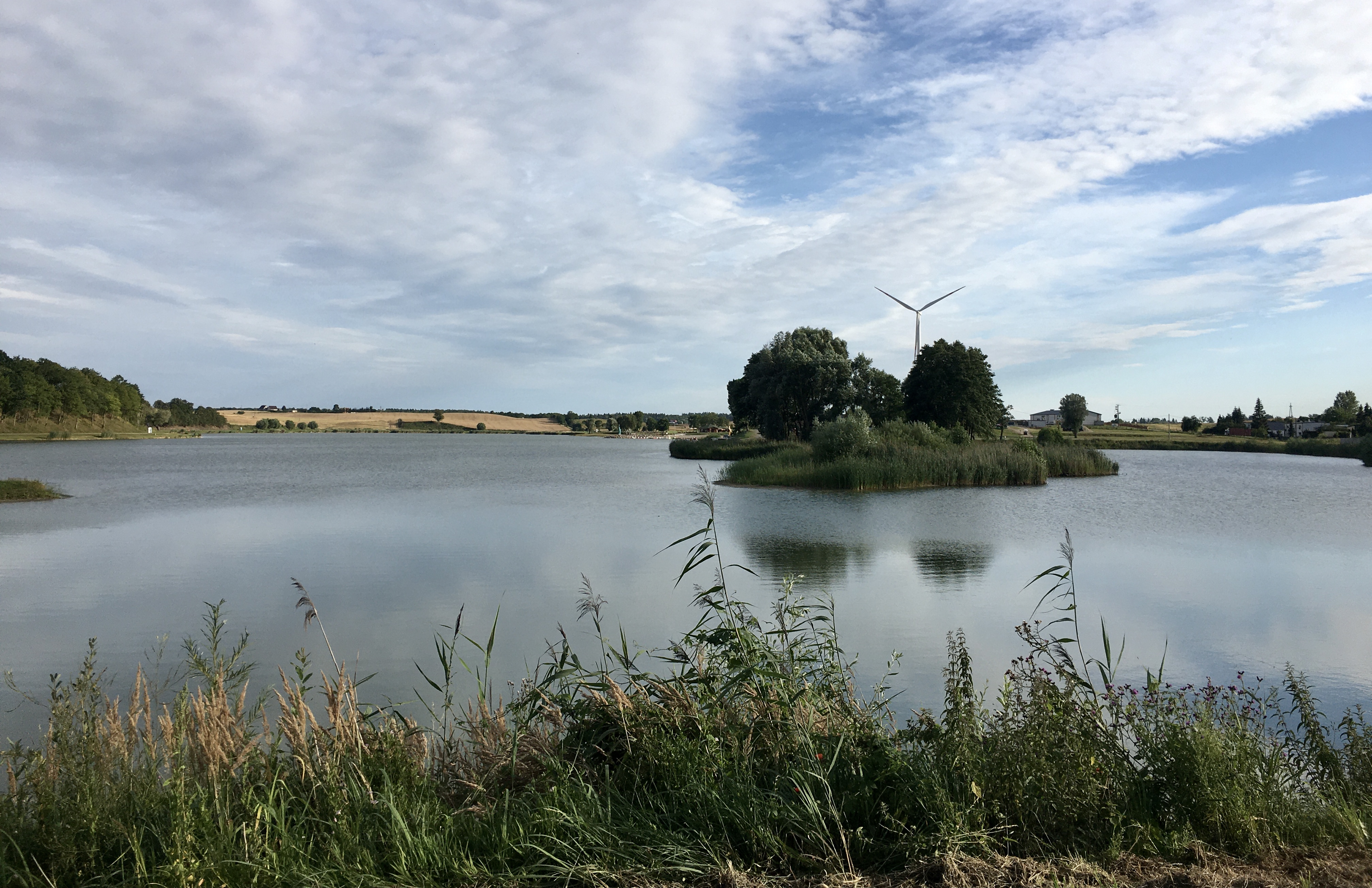
- Lake in Jeleń

- Location within Poland
- Coordinates: 53°47′N 18°47′E
- Country: Poland
- Voivodeship: Pomeranian
- County: Tczew
- Gmina: Gniew
- Population: 626
- Time zone: UTC+1 (CET)
  - Summer (DST): UTC+2 (CEST)
- Vehicle registration: GTC

Jeleń [ˈjɛlɛɲ] is a village in the administrative district of Gmina Gniew, within Tczew County, Pomeranian Voivodeship, in northern Poland. It is located within the ethnocultural region of Kociewie in the historic region of Pomerania.

Jeleń was a royal village of the Kingdom of Poland, administratively located in the Tczew County in the Pomeranian Voivodeship.
