= Rakowiec, Tczew County =

Village in Pomeranian Voivodeship, Poland

Rakowiec
- Village
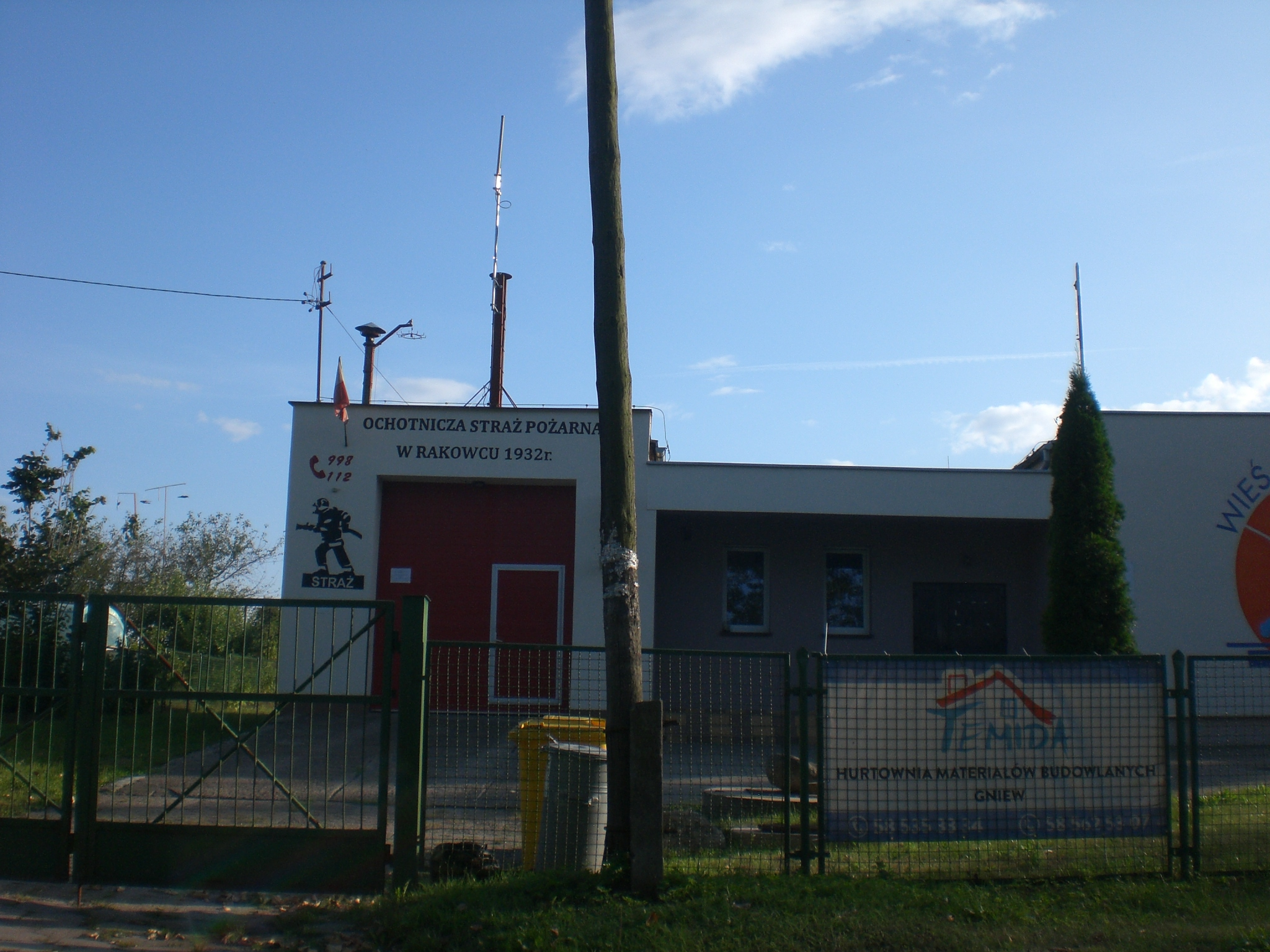
- Station of the volunteer fire brigade in the village

- Location within Poland
- Coordinates: 53°45′59″N 18°46′3″E
- Country: Poland
- Voivodeship: Pomeranian
- County: Tczew
- Gmina: Gniew

Population
  - Total: 544
- Time zone: UTC+1 (CET)
  - Summer (DST): UTC+2 (CEST)
- Vehicle registration: GTC

Rakowiec [raˈkɔvjɛt͡s] is a village in the administrative district of Gmina Gniew, within Tczew County, Pomeranian Voivodeship, in northern Poland. It is located within the ethnocultural region of Kociewie in the historic region of Pomerania.

Rakowiec was a royal village of the Polish Crown, administratively located in the Tczew County in the Pomeranian Voivodeship.
