= Kursztyn =

Village in Pomeranian Voivodeship, Poland

- Village
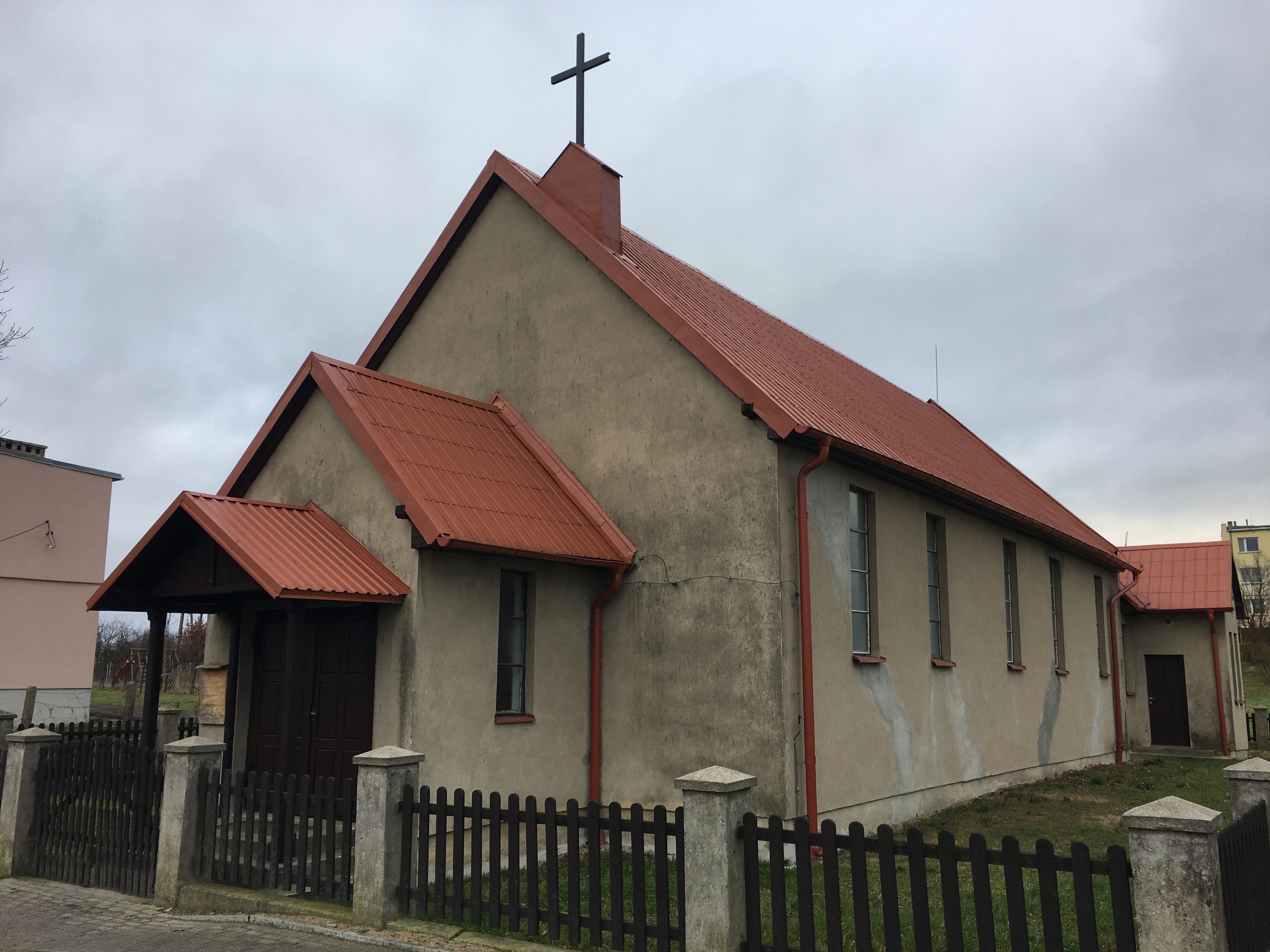
- Our Lady of Częstochowa chapel in the village, 2021

- Location within Poland
- Coordinates: 53°52′48″N 18°45′45″E
- Country: Poland
- Voivodeship: Pomeranian
- County: Tczew
- Gmina: Gniew

Population
  - Total: 476
- Time zone: UTC+1 (CET)
  - Summer (DST): UTC+2 (CEST)
- Vehicle registration: GTC

Kursztyn [ˈkurʂtɨn] is a village in the administrative district of Gmina Gniew, within Tczew County, Pomeranian Voivodeship, in northern Poland. It is located within the ethnocultural region of Kociewie in the historic region of Pomerania.

Kursztyn was a royal village of the Kingdom of Poland, administratively located in the Tczew County in the Pomeranian Voivodeship.
