= Półwieś, Pomeranian Voivodeship =

Village in Pomeranian Voivodeship, Poland

Półwieś
- Village
- Location within Poland
- Coordinates: 53°42′21″N 18°43′12″E
- Country: Poland
- Voivodeship: Pomeranian
- County: Tczew
- Gmina: Gniew

Population
  - Total: 332
- Time zone: UTC+1 (CET)
  - Summer (DST): UTC+2 (CEST)
- Vehicle registration: GTC

Półwieś [ˈpuu̯vjɛɕ] is a village in the administrative district of Gmina Gniew, within Tczew County, Pomeranian Voivodeship, in northern Poland. It is located in the ethnocultural region of Kociewie in the historic region of Pomerania.
