= Lewart Lubartów =

Polish football club

- Founded: May 1923; 103 years ago
- Ground: Stadion MOSiR
- Capacity: 1,500
- Chairman: Janusz Podleśny
- Manager: Grzegorz Bonin
- League: IV liga Lublin
- 2025–26: IV liga Lublin, 2nd of 16
- Website: www.lewartlubartow.com
Home colours	Away colours	Third colours

Lewart Lubartów is a Polish professional football team based in Lubartów. They currently play in the IV liga Lublin, the fifth tier of the Polish football league.

== History ==
Lewart Lubartów was formed in May 1923. In the 1999–2000 season, they gained promotion to the third tier of the Polish football league for the first time in their history. In the 2001–02 season, Lewart reached their highest ever league position of eight in the III liga. They have spent four seasons at the third tier, most recently in 2004–05.

== Stadium ==
The club play their home matches at Stadion MOSiR in Lubartów, which has a capacity of 1,500.
