= Pieniążkowo =

Village in Pomeranian Voivodeship, Poland

- Village
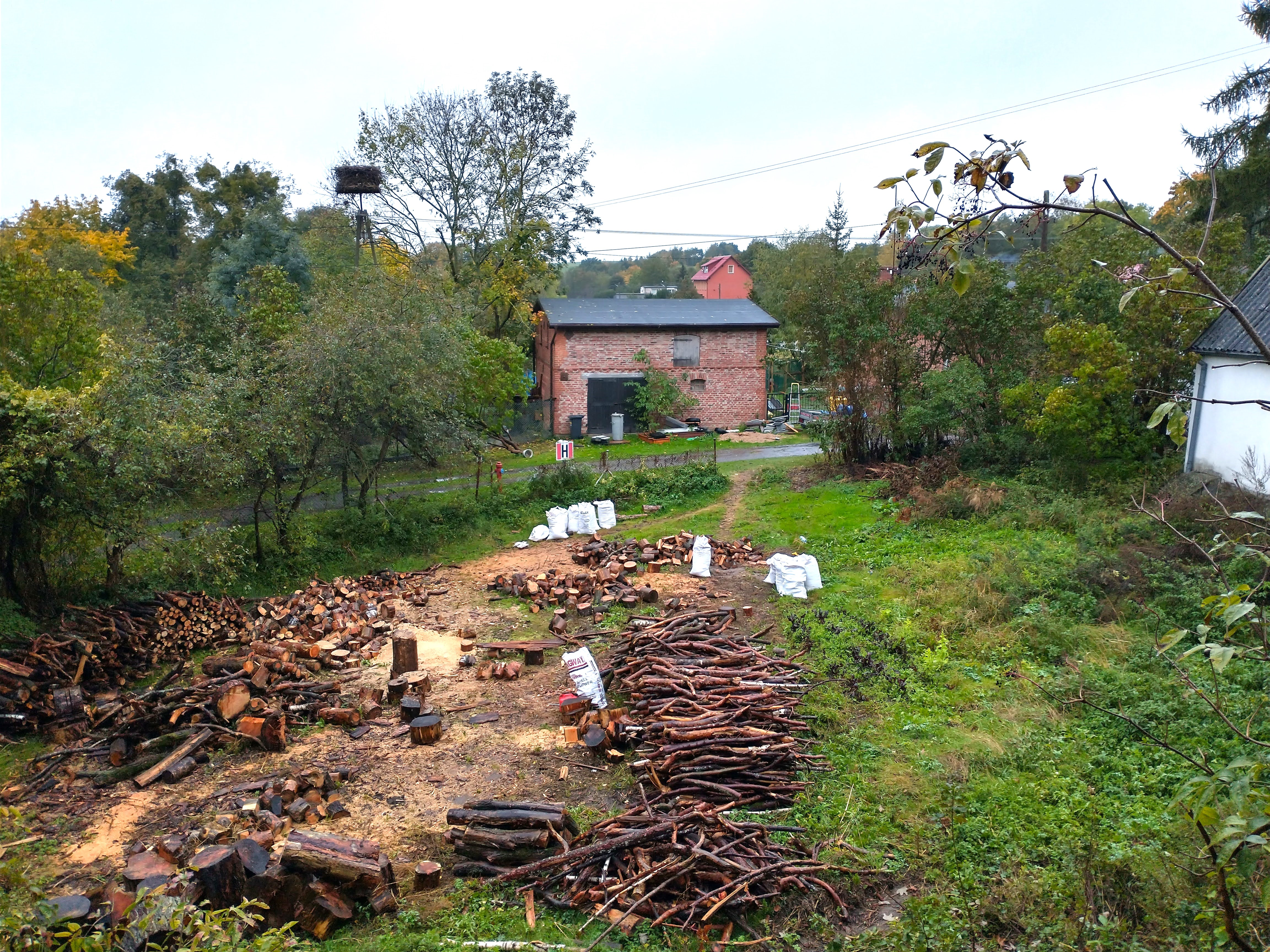
- The village in 2023

- Location within Poland
- Coordinates: 53°41′46″N 18°43′17″E
- Country: Poland
- Voivodeship: Pomeranian
- County: Tczew
- Gmina: Gniew

Population
  - Total: 351
- Time zone: UTC+1 (CET)
  - Summer (DST): UTC+2 (CEST)
- Vehicle registration: GTC

Pieniążkowo [pjɛɲɔ̃ʂˈkɔvɔ] is a village in the administrative district of Gmina Gniew, within Tczew County, Pomeranian Voivodeship, in northern Poland. It is located in the ethnocultural region of Kociewie in the historic region of Pomerania.
