= Bielica, Pomeranian Voivodeship =

Settlement in Poland

Bielica
- Colony
- Location within Poland
- Coordinates: 53°45′23″N 18°45′05″E
- Country: Poland
- Voivodeship: Pomeranian
- County: Tczew
- Gmina: Gniew
- Time zone: UTC+1 (CET)
  - Summer (DST): UTC+2 (CEST)
- Postal code: 83-135
- SIMC: 0161476
- Vehicle registration: GTC

Bielica [bjɛˈlit͡sa] is a colony in the administrative district of Gmina Gniew, within Tczew County, Pomeranian Voivodeship, in northern Poland. It is located in the ethnocultural region of Kociewie in the historic region of Pomerania.
