= Mała Karczma =

Village in Pomeranian Voivodeship, Poland

- Hamlet
- Location within Poland
- Coordinates: 53°44′56″N 18°45′17″E
- Country: Poland
- Voivodeship: Pomeranian
- County: Tczew
- Gmina: Gniew

Population
  - Total: 50
- Time zone: UTC+1 (CET)
  - Summer (DST): UTC+2 (CEST)
- Vehicle registration: GTC

Mała Karczma [ˈmawa ˈkart͡ʂma] is a village in the administrative district of Gmina Gniew, within Tczew County, Pomeranian Voivodeship, in northern Poland. The village is located in the ethnocultural region of Kociewie in the historic region of Pomerania.
