= Piaseckie Pole =

Settlement in Pomeranian Voivodeship, Poland

Piaseckie Pole Piaseckie Pola
- Colony
- Location within Poland
- Coordinates: 53°48′22″N 18°43′51″E
- Country: Poland
- Voivodeship: Pomeranian
- County: Tczew
- Gmina: Gniew

Population
  - Total: 180
- Time zone: UTC+1 (CET)
  - Summer (DST): UTC+2 (CEST)
- Vehicle registration: GTC

Piaseckie Pole [pjaˈsɛt͡skʲɛ ˈpɔlɛ] is a colony in the administrative district of Gmina Gniew, within Tczew County, Pomeranian Voivodeship, in northern Poland. It is located in the ethnocultural region of Kociewie in the historic region of Pomerania.
