= Kolonia Ostrowicka =

Village in Pomeranian Voivodeship, Poland

- Colony
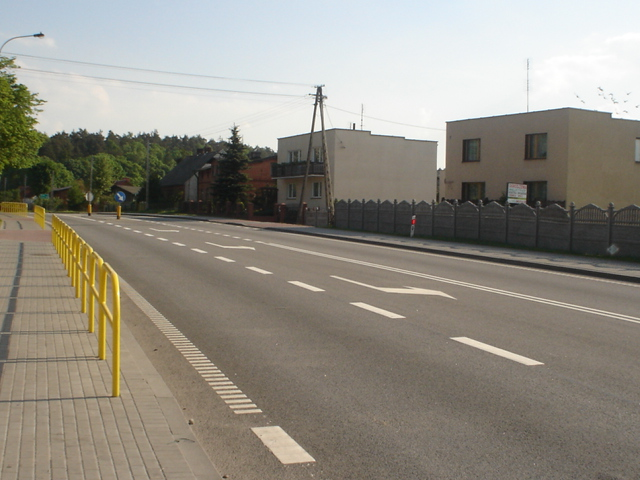

- Location within Poland
- Coordinates: 53°43′59″N 18°44′3″E
- Country: Poland
- Voivodeship: Pomeranian
- County: Tczew
- Gmina: Gniew

Population
  - Total: 610 (2,006)
- Time zone: UTC+1 (CET)
  - Summer (DST): UTC+2 (CEST)
- Vehicle registration: GTC

Kolonia Ostrowicka [kɔˈlɔɲa ɔstrɔˈvit͡ska] is a colony in the administrative district of Gmina Gniew, within Tczew County, Pomeranian Voivodeship, in northern Poland. Kolonia Ostrowicka is located in the ethnocultural region of Kociewie in the historic region of Pomerania.
