= Gmina Gniew =

Administrative district in Kociewie

Gmina Gniew Gniew Commune
- Gmina
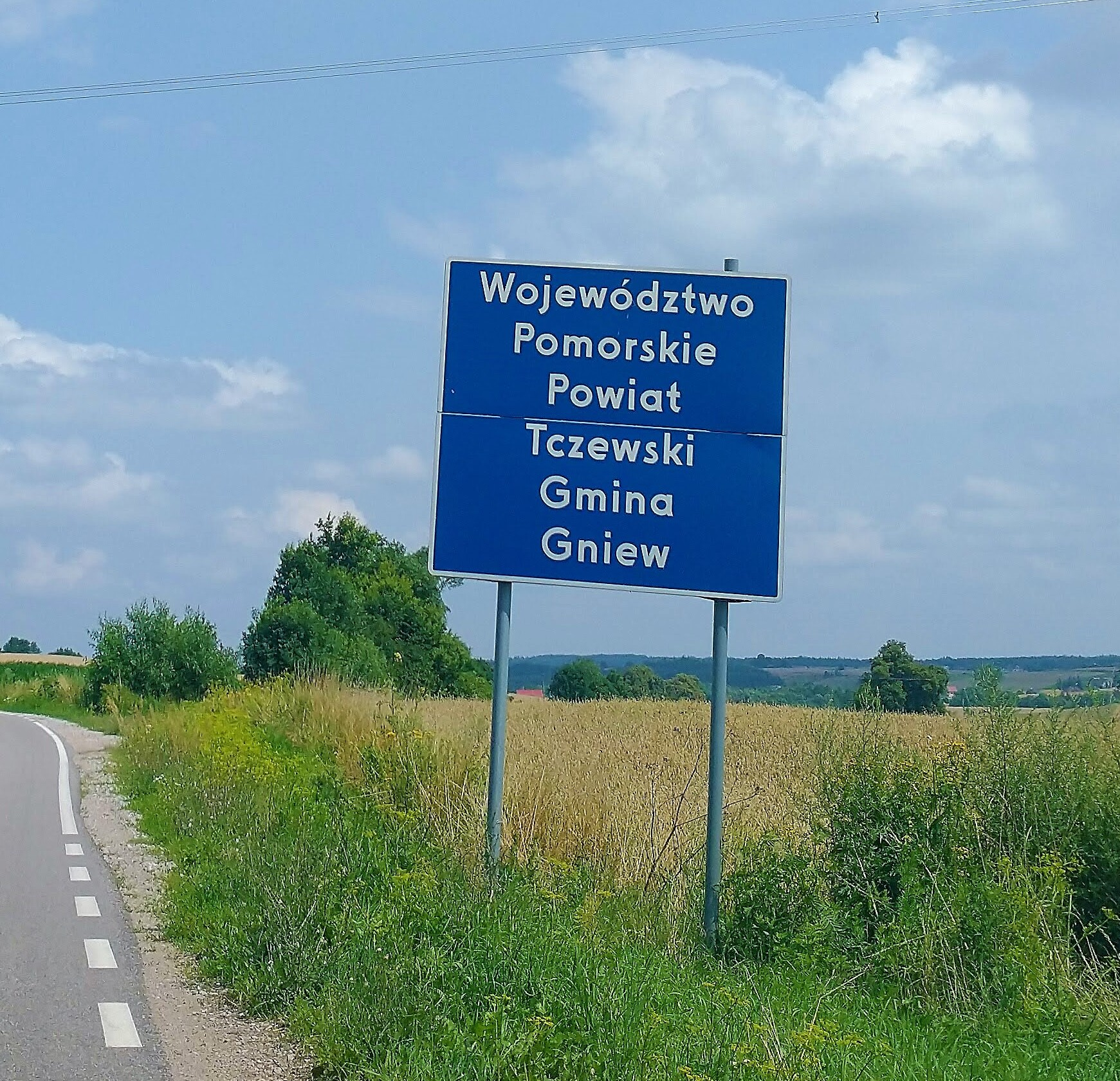
- A roadsign for the gmina

- Flag Coat of arms
- Interactive map of Gmina Gniew
- Coordinates (Gniew): 53°50′0″N 18°50′0″E
- Country: Poland
- Voivodeship: Pomeranian
- County: Tczew
- Seat: Gniew

Area
  - Total: 194.78 km^{2} (75.20 sq mi)

Population (2006)
  - Total: 15,534
  - Density: 79.752/km^{2} (206.56/sq mi)
  - Urban: 6,787
  - Rural: 8,747
- Website: http://www.gniew.pl/

Gmina Gniew is an urban-rural gmina (administrative district) in Tczew County, Pomeranian Voivodeship, in northern Poland. Its seat is the town of Gniew, which lies approximately 31 kilometres (19 mi) south of Tczew and 61 km (38 mi) south of the regional capital Gdańsk.

The gmina covers an area of 194.78 square kilometres (75.2 sq mi), and as of 2006 its total population is 15,534 (out of which the population of Gniew amounts to 6,787, and the population of the rural part of the gmina is 8,747).

== Villages ==
Apart from the town of Gniew, Gmina Gniew contains the villages and settlements of Aplinki, Bielica, Brody, Ciepłe, Cierzpice, Dąbrówka, Duże Wiosło, Gogolewo, Jaźwiska, Jeleń, Kolonia Ostrowicka, Kuchnia, Kursztyn, Mała Karczma, Małe Wiosło, Nicponia, Opalenie, Ostrowite, Piaseckie Pole, Piaseczno, Pieniążkowo, Polskie Gronowo, Półwieś, Rakowiec, Stary Młyn, Szprudowo, Tymawa, Widlice, Wielkie Walichnowy, Wielkie Wyręby and Włosienica.

== Neighbouring gminas ==
Gmina Gniew is bordered by the gminas of Kwidzyn, Morzeszczyn, Nowe, Pelplin, Ryjewo, Sadlinki, Smętowo Graniczne and Sztum.
