= Cierzpice =

Village in Pomeranian Voivodeship, Poland

- Village
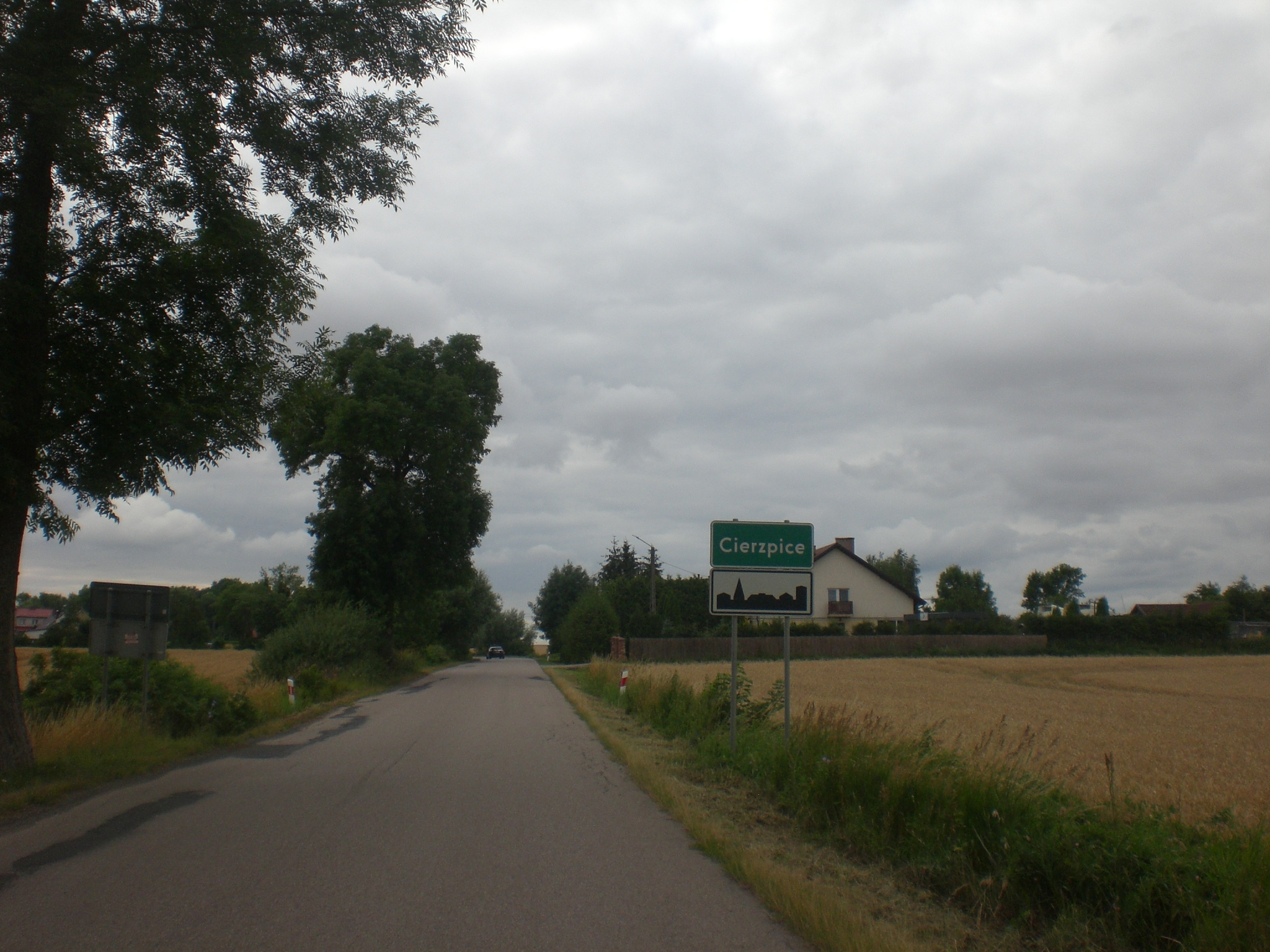

- Location within Poland
- Coordinates: 53°52′21″N 18°47′19″E
- Country: Poland
- Voivodeship: Pomeranian
- County: Tczew
- Gmina: Gniew

Population
  - Total: 9
- Time zone: UTC+1 (CET)
  - Summer (DST): UTC+2 (CEST)
- Vehicle registration: GTC

Cierzpice [t͡ɕɛʂˈpit͡sɛ] is a village in the administrative district of Gmina Gniew, within Tczew County, Pomeranian Voivodeship, in northern Poland. Cierzpice is located in the ethnocultural region of Kociewie in the historic region of Pomerania.
