= Mewa Gniew =

Association football club in Gniew, Poland

KS Mewa Gniew
- Full name: Klub Sportowy Mewa Gniew
- Nickname: Mewy (The Seagulls)
- Founded: 1958; 68 years ago
- Ground: GOSiR
- Capacity: 300 (80 seated)
- Chairman: Rafał Kokot
- Website: KS MEWA Gniew on Facebook
colours

KS Mewa Gniew is a football club based in Gniew, Kociewie, Poland. They currently do not operate a senior team after finishing the 2022–23 season of Klasa A in 10th place.

== History ==
Mewa Gniew was formed in 1958. The club was formerly sponsored by the local Rolls Royce factory and during this time were renamed KS Mewa RR-WIP Gniew for branding purposes.

In 2001, Mewa Gniew beat rivals KS Majewo 5–3 in a Tczew County derby. During the winter break of the 2010–11 season the club were forced to withdraw from the Klasa A and dissolve the senior team, with the majority of their players transferring to local rivals.

In 2013, the club entered the Puchar Sołtysa sports tournament which took place in Kursztyn, finishing in third place. The following year Mewa Gniew received 5 445,76 PLN in funding from the local government. The same year the club reformed their senior squad and entered the Klasa B, finishing in 6th place for the 2014–15 season. At the close of the 2017–18 season, Mewa gained promotion from the Klasa B as champions of the division.

== Ground ==
Mewa plays at the 300 capacity Gminny Ośrodek Sportu i Rekreacji w Gniewie, a municipal stadium located in their home town. In 2020 59,600 PLN was allocated for the modernisation of the ground for the following season.

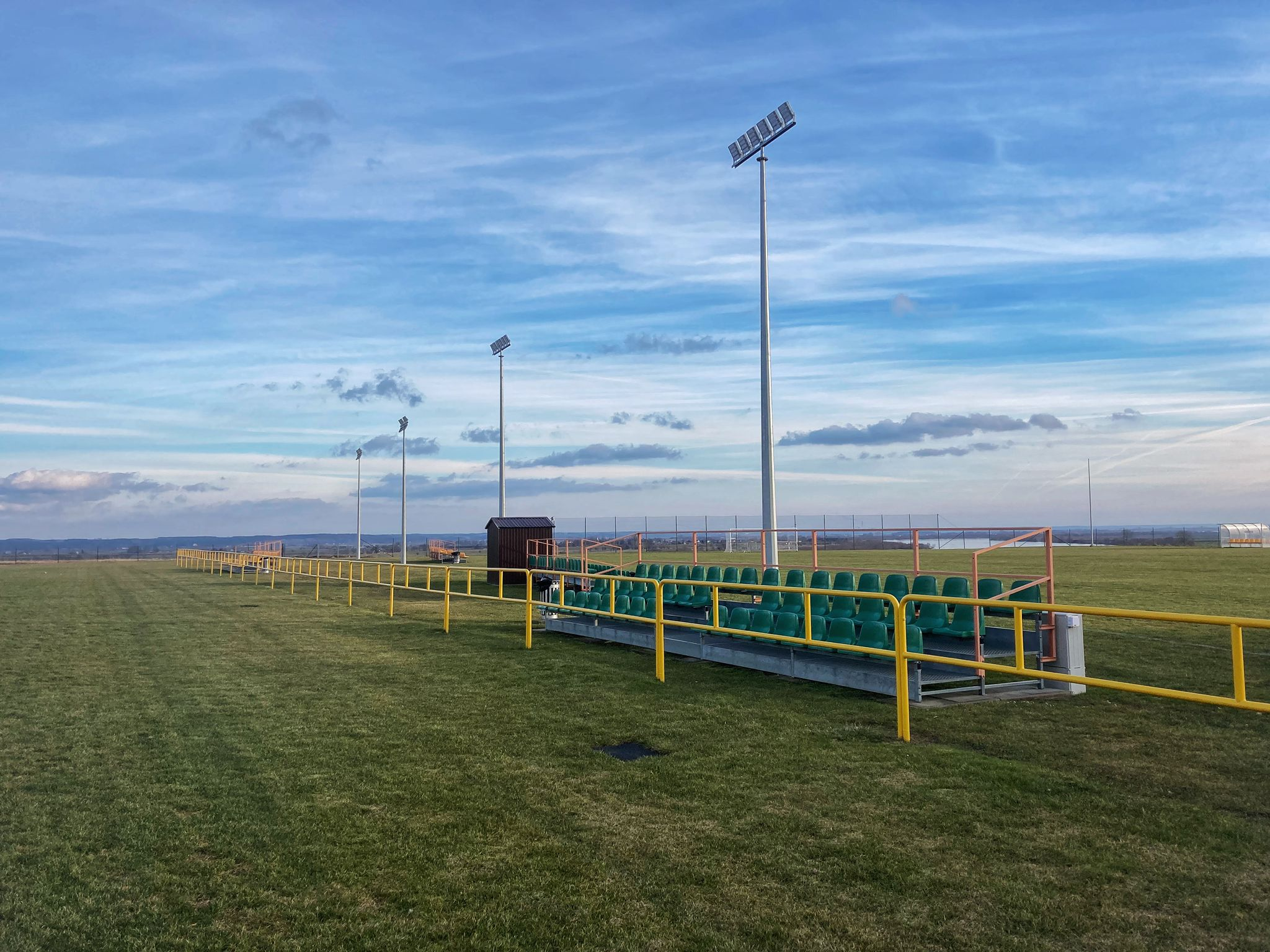
Seating area at Mewa Gniew's GOSiR stadium.

== Colours ==
Mewa Gniew's traditional home colours were green and yellow. In recent years they have played in a red shirt with white arms, black shorts, and red socks.

== Notable former players ==
The Poland international Grzegorz Bonin began his career at Mewa Gniew following in the footsteps of his elder brother who was a player at the club.

== Fans ==
As with most of the region of Kociewie, allegiances are split along the Tricity rivalry with supporters of Mewa Gniew having friendly relations with those of Lechia Gdańsk, although the town also hosts an Arka Gdynia fan club. The club has played against both teams in different competitions. In 1997, Mewa Gniew were drawn at home against Arka Gdynia in the Polish Cup against whom they lost 7–2. In the 2001–02 season, they met Lechia Gdańsk, who had been reformed in the Klasa A, losing 13–1 away and 9–1 at home in what was to be Lechia's best ever start to a season.
