= List of German exonyms in the Pomeranian Voivodeship =

This is a list of German language place names in Poland, now exonyms for towns and villages in the Pomeranian Voivodeship.

== List ==
Polish name	German name
Aakowice	Acker
Bałdowo	Baldau
Bałoszyce	Baloschitz
Bargędzino	Bergensin
Bobowo	Bobau; Dietersfelde (1939-1942)
Borzytuchom	Borntuchen
Bratoszewice	Bratschwitz
Brody Pomorskie	Brüder Pommern
Bytów	Bütow
Cedry Wielkie	Groß Zünder
Cewice	Zewitz
Chlebówka	Brotwinkel
Chojnice	Konitz
Choczewo	Chottschow, Gotendorf (1938-1945)
Czarna Dąbrówka	Schwarze Damerkow
Czarna Woda	Schwarzwasser
Czarne	Hammerstein
Czersk	Czersk; Heiderode (1942-1945)
Człuchów	Schlochau
Damnica	Hebrondamnitz
Dębnica Kaszubska	Rathsdamnitz
Debrzno	Preußisch Friedland
Dziemiany	Dzimianen
Dzierzgoń	Christburg
Darzlubie	Darzlub
Dąbrówka Tczewska	Dirschauer Dombrowka
Dzierżno	Dzierzno
Dworek	Gutshof
Egiertowo	Egertow
Fiszewo	Fischwitz
Gardeja	Garnsee
Gdańsk	Danzig
Gdynia	Gdingen, 1939-1945 Gotenhafen
Główczyce	Glowitz
Gniew	Mewe
Gniewino	Gnewin
Gorzędziej	Gerdin
Grabowska Huta	Grabaushütte
Grzebsk	Gräbchen
Gronowo Elbląskie	Gronowitz
Grodziczno	Grudzendorf
Hel	Hela
Jastarnia	Heisternest
Jabłonowo Pomorskie	Apfelstadt Pommern, Jablonowo, (1903-1945) Goßlershausen
Jantar Leśniczówka	Bernstein Forsthaus
Jastrzębia Góra	Habichtberg
Jastrzębie	Habichtdorf
Wycinki	Karschänke
Karsin	Karschin, Karßin (1939-1945)
Kartuzy	Karthaus
Kępice	Hammermühle
Knybawa	Kniebau
Koczała	Flötenstein
Kolbudy	Ober Kahlbude
Kołczygłowy	Alt Kolziglow
Konarzyny	Groß Konarczyn
Kościerzyna	Berent
Krokowa	Krockow
Krynica Morska	Kahlberg
Kwidzyn	Marienwerder
Łeba	Leba
Łęczyce	Lanz
Lębork	Lauenburg
Lichnowy	Groß Lichtenau
Linia	Linde
Liniewo	Lienfelde
Lipnica	Liepnitz
Lipusz	Lippusch
Lubichowo	Liebichau
Luzino	Lusin, Freienau (1942-1943), Lintzau (1943-1945)
Malbork	Marienburg
Miastko	Rummelsburg
Mikołajki Pomorskie	Niklaskirchen
Miłoradz	Mielenz
Nowa Wieś Lęborska	Neuendorf
Nowy Dwór Gdański	Tiegenhof
Nowy Staw	Neuteich
Osieczna	Hagenort
Ostaszewo	Schöneberg
Parchowo	Parchau
Potęgowo	Pottangow
Pruszcz Gdański	Praust
Puck	Putzig
Rajkowy	Reichow
Radostowo	Radostau
Rozental	Roßenthal
Rudno	Rudendorf
Subkowy	Subkow
Subkowy Dworzec	Subkow Bahnhof
Szymankowo	Schimankow
Wisłoujście	Weichselmünde
Wycinki	Pommersche Abholzungen
Żarówka	Scharlich

== See also ==
List of German exonyms for places in Poland
