= Liniewko =

Village in Pomeranian Voivodeship, Poland

- Village
- Location within Poland
- Coordinates: 54°2′44″N 18°37′47″E
- Country: Poland
- Voivodeship: Pomeranian
- County: Tczew
- Gmina: Tczew

Population
  - Total: 66
- Time zone: UTC+1 (CET)
  - Summer (DST): UTC+2 (CEST)
- Vehicle registration: GTC

Liniewko [liˈɲɛfkɔ] is a village in the administrative district of Gmina Tczew, within Tczew County, Pomeranian Voivodeship, in northern Poland. It is located within the ethnocultural region of Kociewie in the historic region of Pomerania.

== Name ==
The village name means "line town" after the straight piece of road that runs through it. The village ends with corners in the road at each end.

== Landscape ==
Although the road does not have corners, the road has an incline up to a hill. The top of the hill is located near the 3rd West-most farm.

The farm land located west of the four farms and the road. They belong to each respective farm. This piece is mostly flat land with the exception of two consecutive hills located on the 3rd West-most town.

There are two other pieces of farm land. One is located east of the road and between the farms and the hamlet. It is flat, save for a small stream that runs through it.

The last piece of farmland lies east of the road opposite the first three of the West-most farms. It is distinctive for the tree islands of shrubbery, trees and wetland plants like bullrush. The land is mostly flat with the east most side both climbing and sinking to create a steep 30 degree slope. The outer edge of this field has a steady stream and on the other side of it a sharp forested hill with an incline of some 40-50 degrees.

== Structure ==
Liniewko is a very small village, composed of 4 major family run farms and a hamlet. There are two bus stops in between the farms and the hamlet - one for each direction. The neighbouring village neighbors is Wędkowy, approximately 0.5 km (0 mi) to the north-west and Swarożyn town, some 4 km (2 mi) to the south-east.

The nearest school is located in Swarożyn, as is the nearest library, (Catholic) church, post office, railway station and (most of) the convenience shops. The closest convenience shop is in Wędkowy.

== Traffic ==
Since the opening and later the expansion of manufacturing buildings in Wędkowy, the road has become substantially more busy. This is particularly evident in the number of heavy goods vehicles. Additionally where the factories operate between 16 and 24 hours a day across two or three shifts, there remains regular periods of substantial traffic stream of buses and personal vehicles at the times of shift changes.
