= Stęclówka =

Village in Pomeranian Voivodeship, Poland

- Colony
- Location within Poland Location within Pomeranian Voivodeship
- Coordinates: 54°02′36″N 18°47′13″E
- Country: Poland
- Voivodeship: Pomeranian
- County: Tczew
- Gmina: Tczew
- Time zone: UTC+1 (CET)
  - Summer (DST): UTC+2 (CEST)
- Vehicle registration: GTC

Stęclówka (Polish: [stɛnˈt͡sluf.ka]) is a colony in Pomeranian Voivodeship, in northern Poland, located in the Gmina Tczew, Tczew County. It is located in the ethnocultural region of Kociewie in the historic region of Pomerania.
