= Bojary, Pomeranian Voivodeship =

Village in Pomeranian Voivodeship, Poland

Bojary
- Colony
- Location within Poland
- Coordinates: 54°3′23″N 18°33′43″E
- Country: Poland
- Voivodeship: Pomeranian
- County: Tczew
- Gmina: Tczew
- Time zone: UTC+1 (CET)
  - Summer (DST): UTC+2 (CEST)
- Vehicle registration: GTC

Bojary [bɔˈjarɨ] is a colony in the administrative district of Gmina Tczew, within Tczew County, Pomeranian Voivodeship, in northern Poland. It is located in the ethnocultural region of Kociewie in the historic region of Pomerania.
