= National road 22 (Poland) =

National road in Poland

National Road 22
- Droga krajowa nr 22

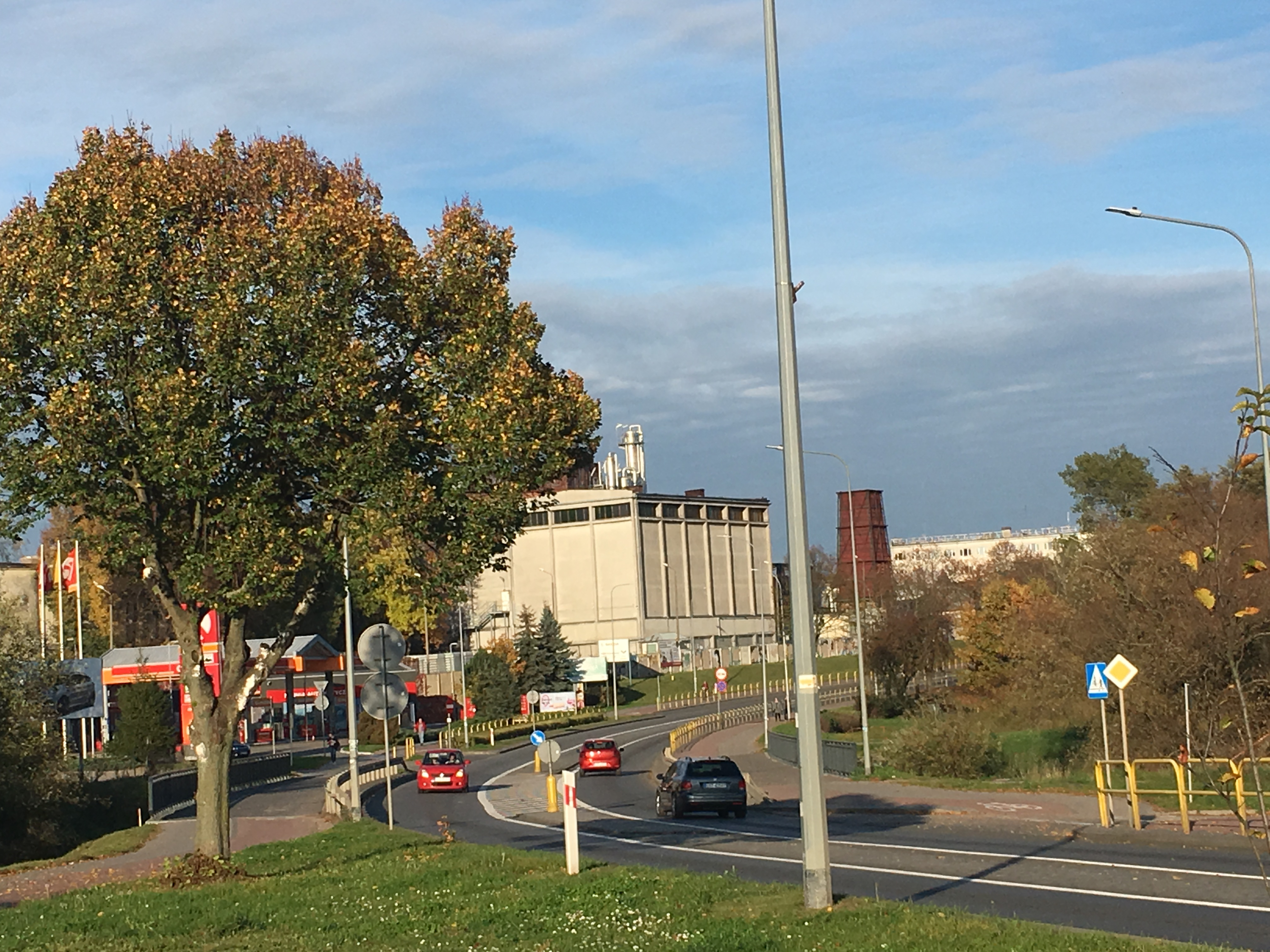
- National Road 22 in Starogard Gdański

Route information
- Maintained by GDDKiA
- Length: 460 km (290 mi)

Major junctions
- West end: German border in Kostrzyn
- East end: Russian border in Grzechotki

Location
- Country: Poland
- Regions: Lubusz Voivodeship, West Pomeranian Voivodeship, Greater Poland Voivodeship, Pomeranian Voivodeship, Warmian-Masurian Voivodeship

Highway system
- National roads in Poland; Voivodeship roads
← DK 21	→ DK 23

National Road 22 (Polish: Droga krajowa 22, abbreviated DK 22) is a route belonging to the Polish national roads network. The route is in the north of Poland and runs from the German border, in Kostrzyn, to the Russian border, in Grzechotki for 460 km. The route runs through the Lubusz Voivodeship, West Pomeranian Voivodeship, Greater Poland Voivodeship, Pomeranian Voivodeship and the Warmian-Masurian Voivodeship

== Expressway S22 ==
The section of the route from the Elbląg Wschód junction to the Russian border in Grzechotki is a single-carriageway expressway, but it includes a reserve for a second carriageway.

== Important settlements along the National Road 22 ==
- Kostrzyn nad Odrą Border with Germany
- Gorzów Wielkopolski
- Strzelce Krajeńskie
- Dobiegniew
- Człopa
- Wałcz
- Jastrowie
- Podgaje
- Człuchów
- Chojnice
- Czersk
- Czarna Woda
- Starogard Gdański
- Swarożyn
- Czarlin
- Malbork
- Elbląg
- Chruściel, Braniewo Południe Interchange
- Grzechotki Russian Border

== Axle load limit ==
Since 13 March 2021, vehicles with a single driving axle load of up to 11.5 tonnes have been permitted to use the road, except in specific locations marked with the B-19 restriction sign.

Before 13 March 2021

Previously, National Road 22 was subject to axle load restrictions:

Sign	Axle load limit	Section
DK22	up to 10 tons	German Border – Kostrzyn – Wałdowice – Gorzów Wielkopolski – Wałcz – Jastrowie; Podgaje – Człuchów – Chojnice – Starogard Gdański – Swarożyn (Interchange „Swarożyn”); Czarlin – Malbork – Elbląg (Interchange „Elbląg Południe”)

Between 2020 and 2022, the section between Chojnice and Czersk was rebuilt to increase its load capacity to 11.5 t/axle. By 2028, a bypass of Starogard Gdański is planned to be constructed between Sucumin and Starogard Gdański, which will carry National Road 22.
