= Zabagno =

Village in Pomeranian Voivodeship, Poland

- Hamlet
- Location within Poland
- Coordinates: 54°1′32″N 18°38′32″E
- Country: Poland
- Voivodeship: Pomeranian
- County: Tczew
- Gmina: Tczew

Population
  - Total: 346
- Time zone: UTC+1 (CET)
  - Summer (DST): UTC+2 (CEST)
- Vehicle registration: GTC

Zabagno [zaˈbaɡnɔ] is a hamlet in the administrative district of Gmina Tczew, within Tczew County, Pomeranian Voivodeship, in northern Poland. It is located in the ethnocultural region of Kociewie in the historical region of Pomerania.
