= Turze, Pomeranian Voivodeship =

Village in Pomeranian Voivodeship, Poland

Turze
- Village
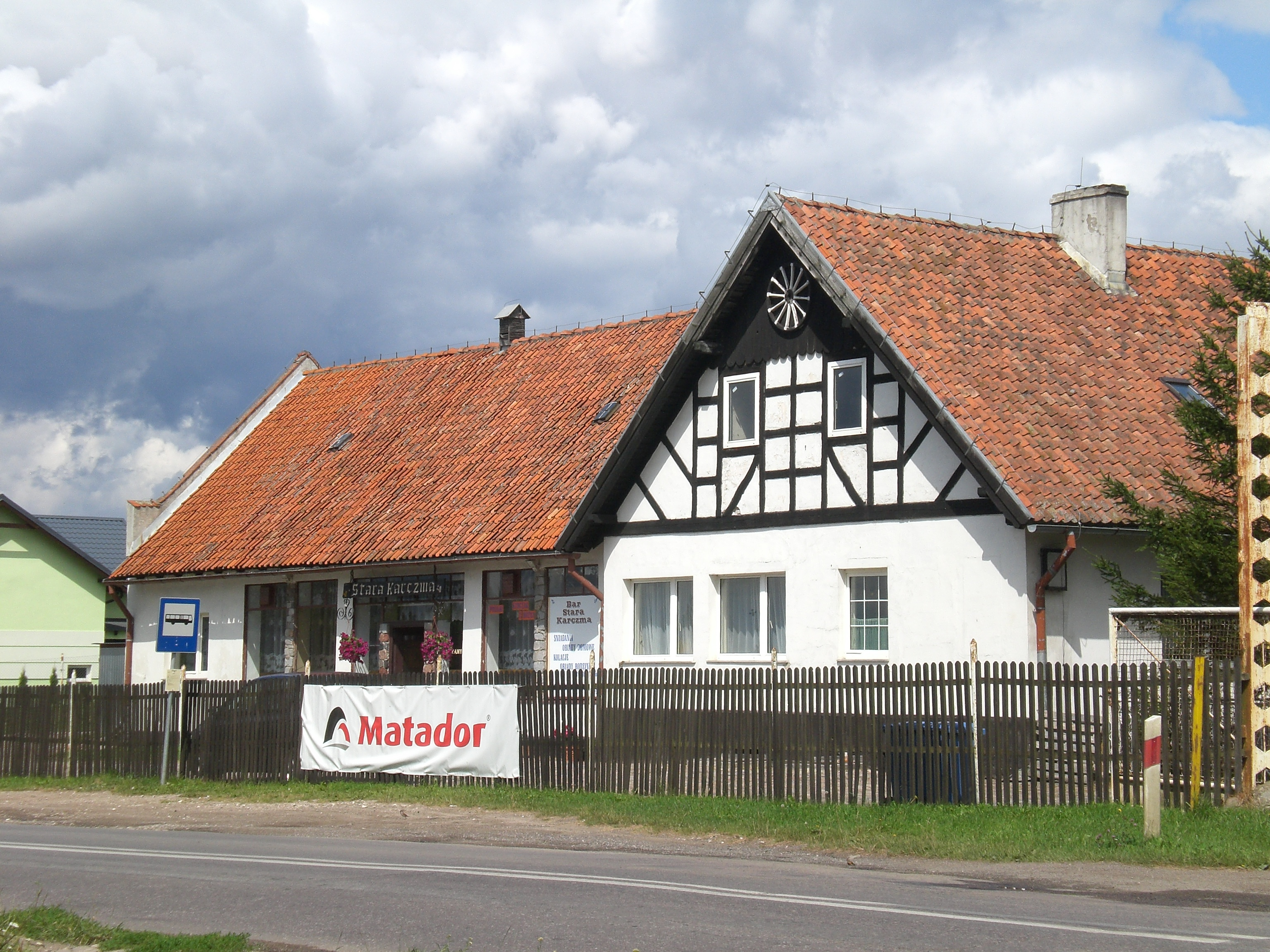
- The Stara Karczma bar in the village

- Location within Poland
- Coordinates: 54°5′40″N 18°37′49″E
- Country: Poland
- Voivodeship: Pomeranian
- County: Tczew
- Gmina: Tczew
- Elevation: 25 m (82 ft)

Population
  - Total: 966
- Time zone: UTC+1 (CET)
  - Summer (DST): UTC+2 (CEST)
- Vehicle registration: GTC

Turze [ˈtuʐɛ] is a village in the administrative district of Gmina Tczew, within Tczew County, Pomeranian Voivodeship, in northern Poland. It is located within the ethnocultural region of Kociewie in the historic region of Pomerania.
