= Małżewko =

Village in Pomeranian Voivodeship, Poland

- Village
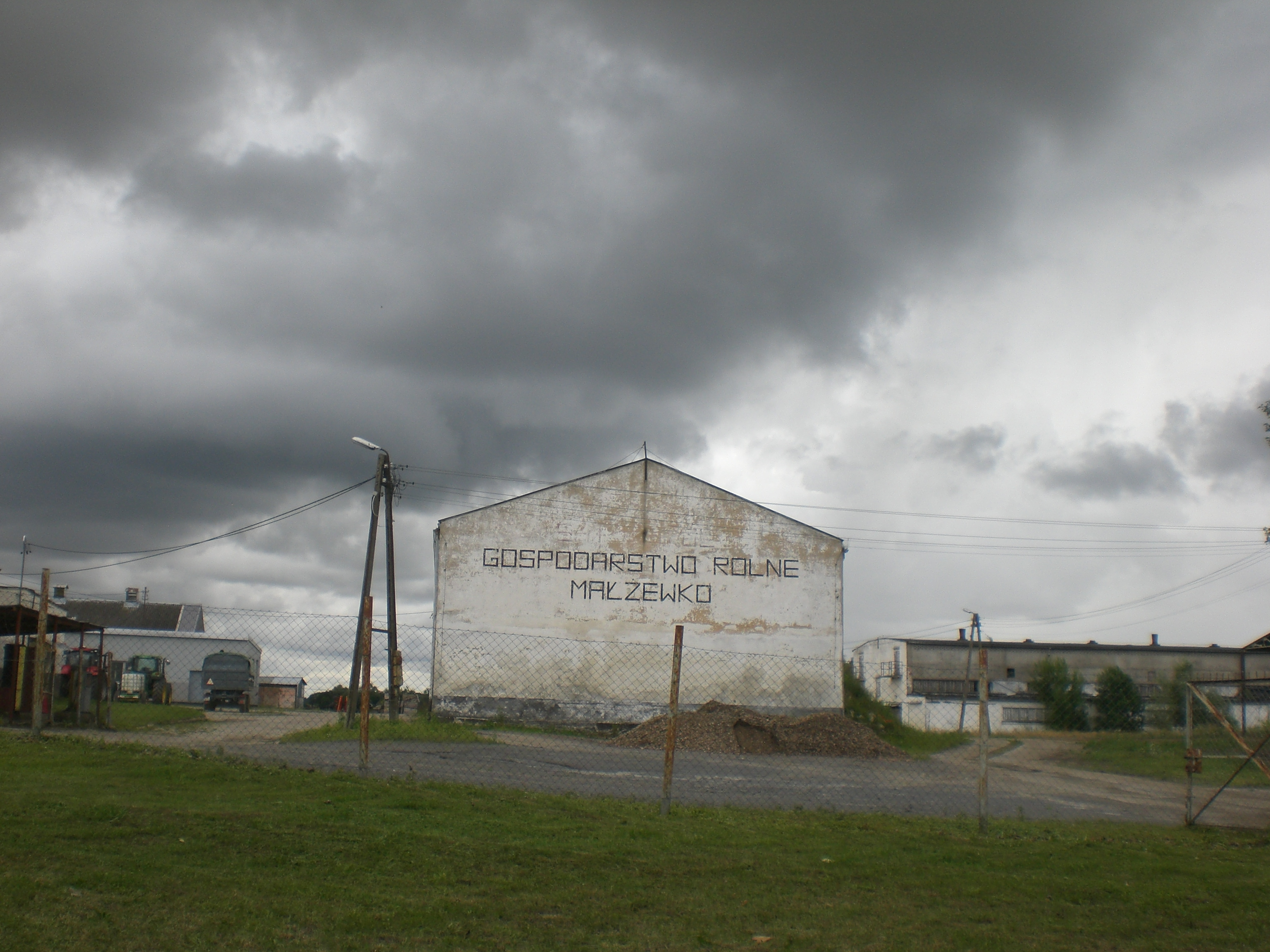
- Farm buildings in the village

- Location within Poland
- Coordinates: 54°5′2″N 18°39′0″E
- Country: Poland
- Voivodeship: Pomeranian
- County: Tczew
- Gmina: Tczew

Population
  - Total: 182
- Time zone: UTC+1 (CET)
  - Summer (DST): UTC+2 (CEST)
- Vehicle registration: GTC

Małżewko [mau̯ˈʐɛfkɔ] is a village in the administrative district of Gmina Tczew, within Tczew County, Pomeranian Voivodeship, in northern Poland. It is located within the ethnocultural region of Kociewie in the historic region of Pomerania.
