= Waćmierek =

Village in Pomeranian Voivodeship, Poland

- Village
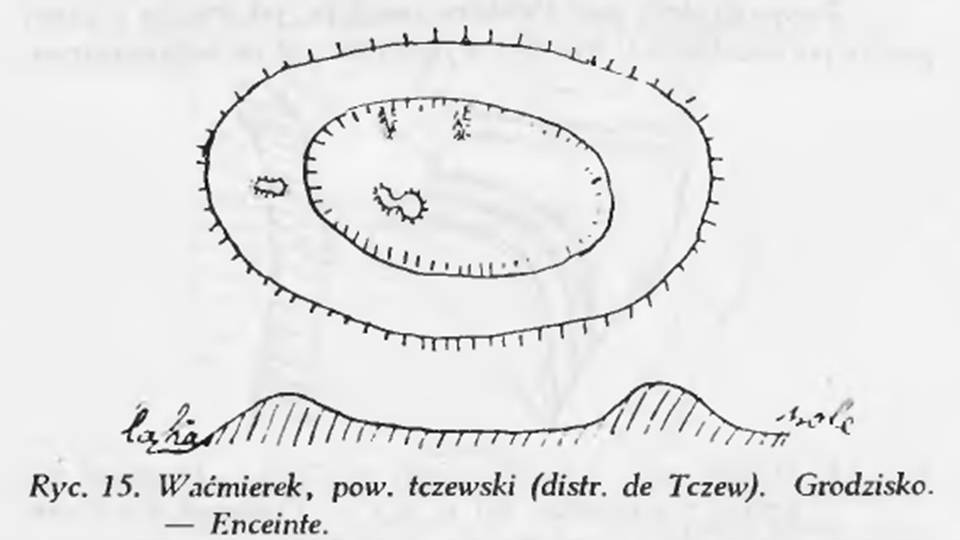
- Illustration of the archeological remains of an early medieval stronghold located in the village

- Location within Poland
- Coordinates: 54°2′41″N 18°42′13″E
- Country: Poland
- Voivodeship: Pomeranian
- County: Tczew
- Gmina: Tczew

Population
  - Total: 126
- Time zone: UTC+1 (CET)
  - Summer (DST): UTC+2 (CEST)
- Vehicle registration: GTC

Waćmierek [vat͡ɕˈmjɛrɛk] is a village in the administrative district of Gmina Tczew, within Tczew County, Pomeranian Voivodeship, in northern Poland. It is located within the ethnocultural region of Kociewie in the historic region of Pomerania.
