= Szczerbięcin =

Village in Pomeranian Voivodeship, Poland

- Village
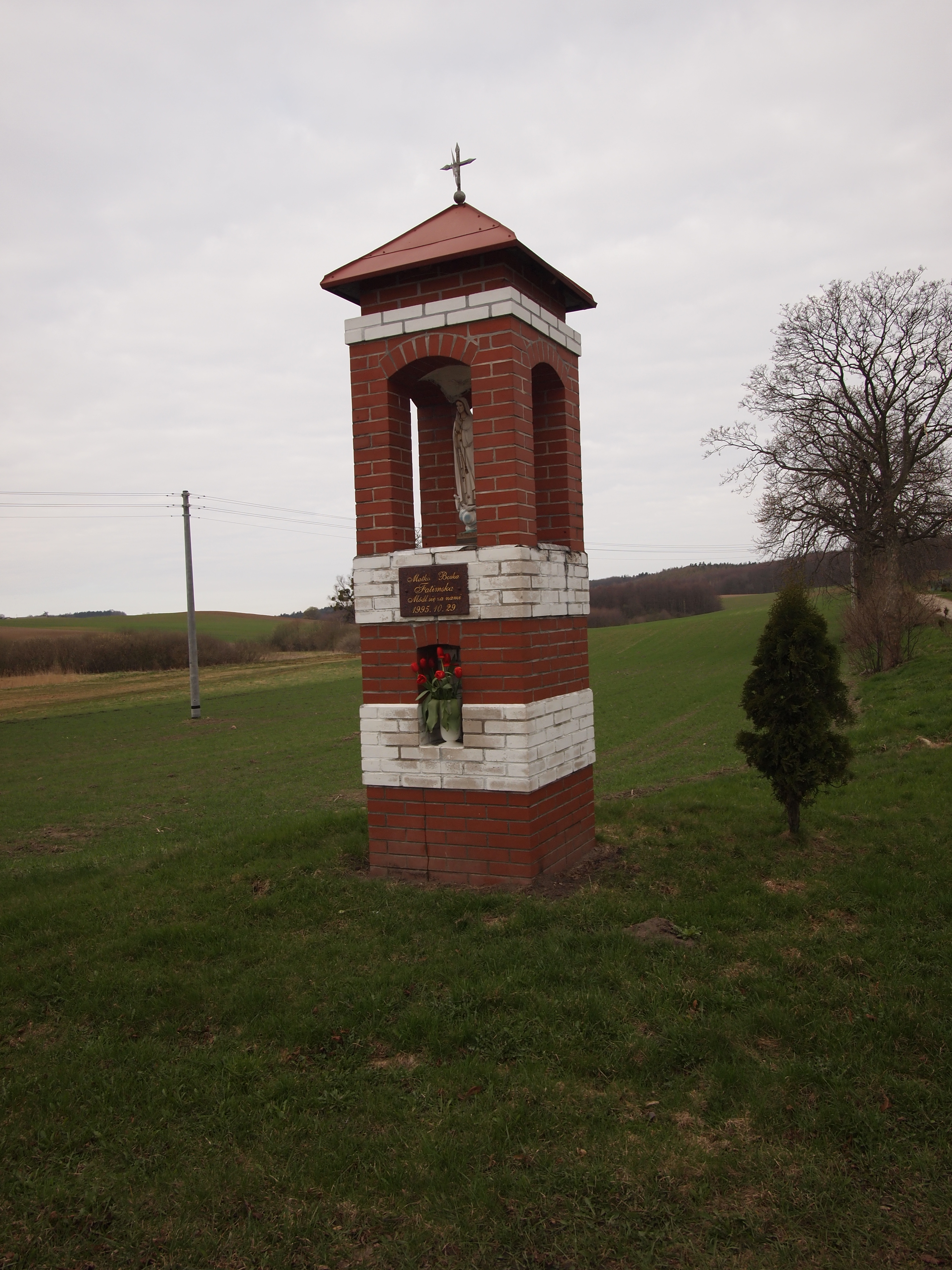
- A wayside shrine in Szczerbięcin

- Location within Poland
- Coordinates: 54°6′51″N 18°37′4″E
- Country: Poland
- Voivodeship: Pomeranian
- County: Tczew
- Gmina: Tczew

Population
  - Total: 215
- Time zone: UTC+1 (CET)
  - Summer (DST): UTC+2 (CEST)
- Vehicle registration: GTC

Szczerbięcin [ʂt͡ʂɛrˈbjɛnt͡ɕin] is a village in the administrative district of Gmina Tczew, within Tczew County, Pomeranian Voivodeship, in northern Poland. It is located in the ethnocultural region of Kociewie in the historic region of Pomerania.
