= Tczewskie Łąki =

Village in Pomeranian Voivodeship, Poland

- Village
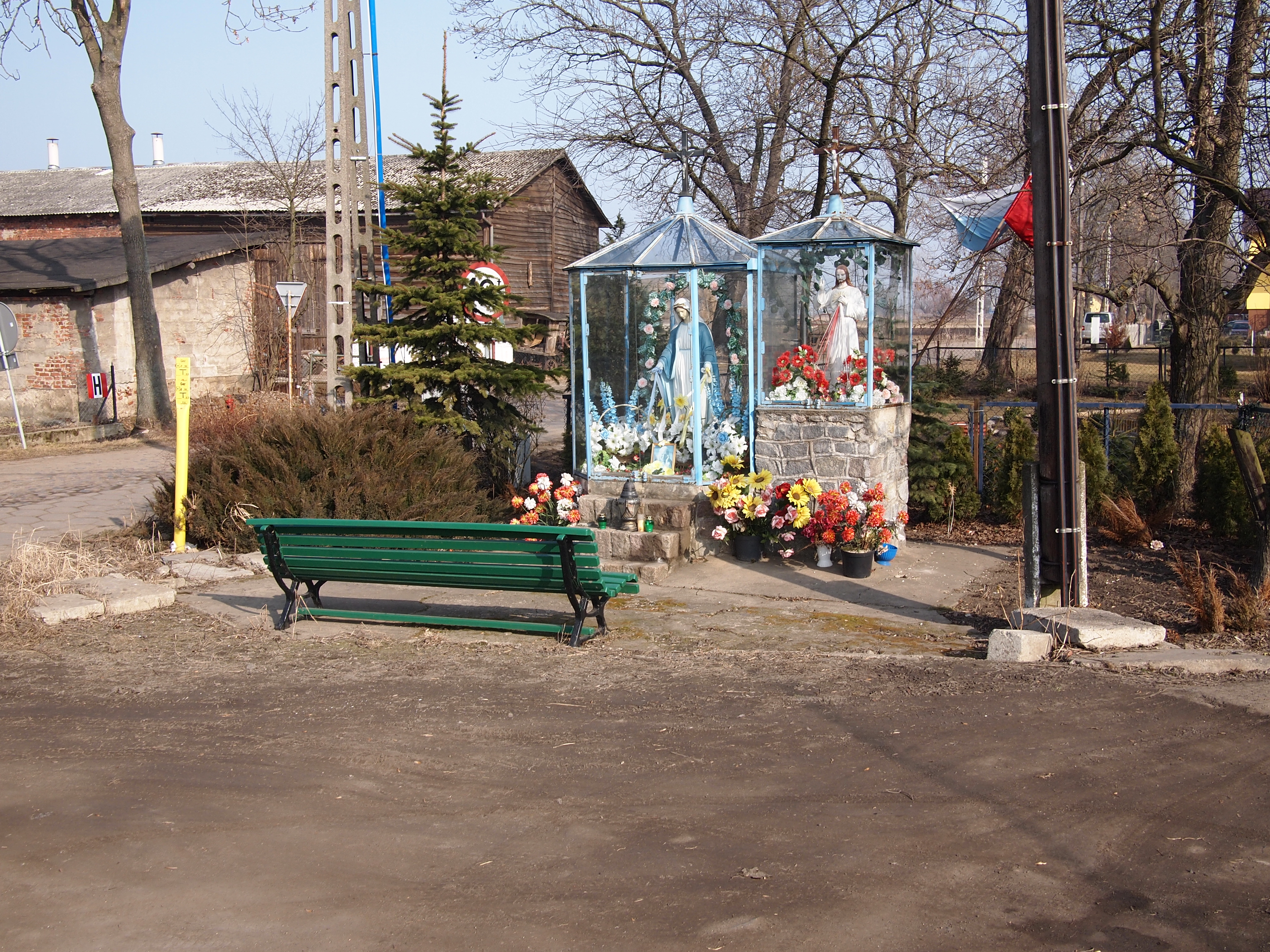
- A bench in front of two wayside shrines in the village

- Location within Poland
- Coordinates: 54°7′16″N 18°47′0″E
- Country: Poland
- Voivodeship: Pomeranian
- County: Tczew
- Gmina: Tczew

Population
  - Total: 562
- Time zone: UTC+1 (CET)
  - Summer (DST): UTC+2 (CEST)
- Vehicle registration: GTC

Tczewskie Łąki (Polish pronunciation: [ˈttʂɛfskʲɛ ˈwɔŋkʲi]) is a village in the administrative district of Gmina Tczew, within Tczew County, Pomeranian Voivodeship, in northern Poland. It is located within the ethnocultural region of Kociewie in the historic region of Pomerania.
