= Goszyn, Tczew County =

Village in Pomeranian Voivodeship, Poland

Goszyn
- Village
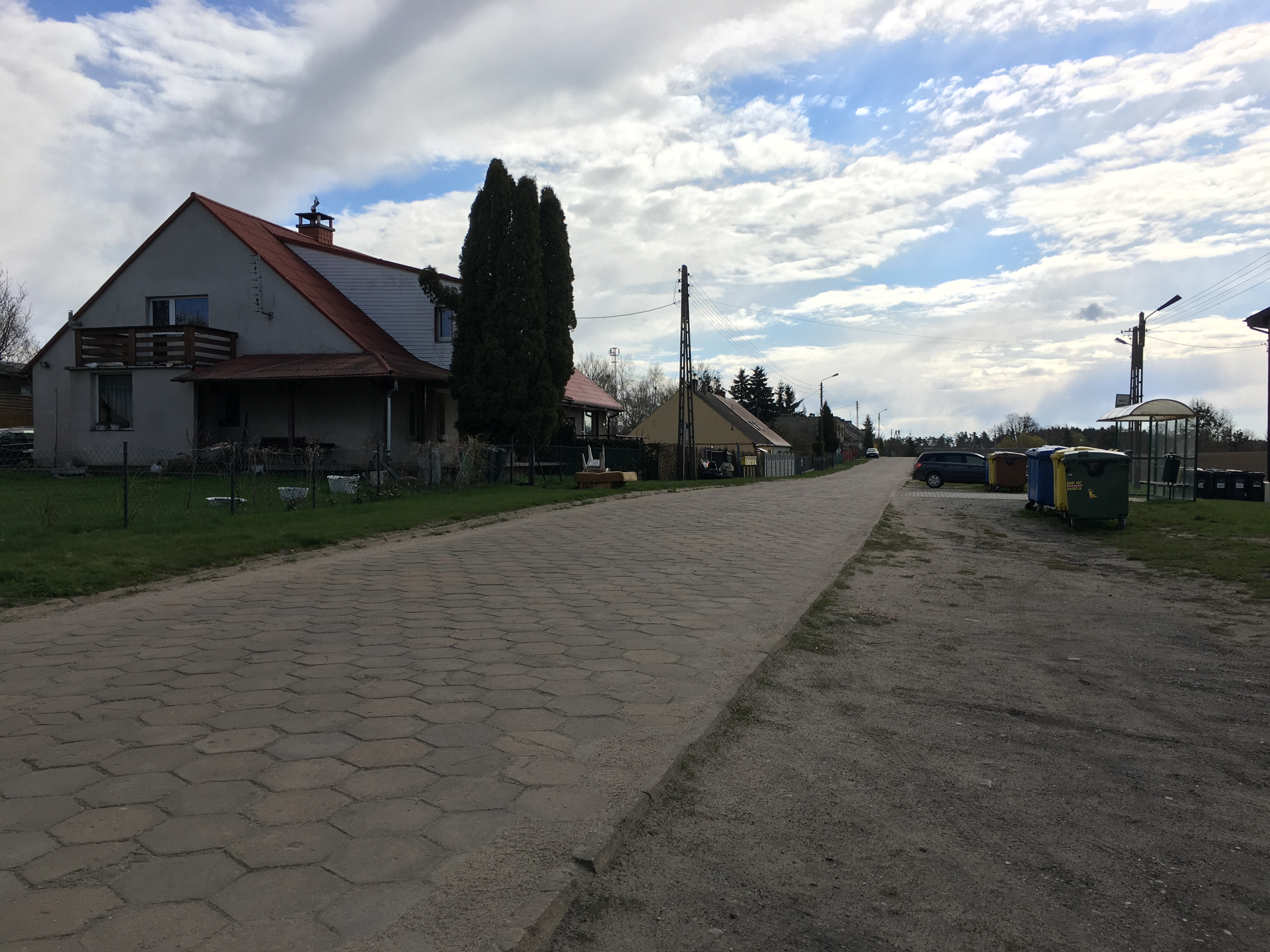

- Location within Poland
- Coordinates: 54°3′52″N 18°39′36″E
- Country: Poland
- Voivodeship: Pomeranian
- County: Tczew
- Gmina: Tczew

Population
  - Total: 172
- Time zone: UTC+1 (CET)
  - Summer (DST): UTC+2 (CEST)
- Vehicle registration: GTC

Goszyn [ˈɡɔʂɨn] is a village in the administrative district of Gmina Tczew, within Tczew County, Pomeranian Voivodeship, in northern Poland. It is located in the ethnocultral region of Kociewie in the historic region of Pomerania.
