= Śliwiny, Pomeranian Voivodeship =

Village in Pomeranian Voivodeship, Poland

Śliwiny
- Village
- Location within Poland
- Coordinates: 54°3′54″N 18°44′3″E
- Country: Poland
- Voivodeship: Pomeranian
- County: Tczew
- Gmina: Tczew
- Population: 373
- Time zone: UTC+1 (CET)
  - Summer (DST): UTC+2 (CEST)
- Vehicle registration: GTC

Śliwiny [ɕliˈvinɨ] is a village in the administrative district of Gmina Tczew, within Tczew County, Pomeranian Voivodeship, in northern Poland. It is located within the ethnocultural region of Kociewie in the historic region of Pomerania.

== History ==
Śliwiny was a possession of the city of Tczew, administratively located in the Tczew County in the Pomeranian Voivodeship of the Kingdom of Poland.

During the German occupation of Poland (World War II), in 1941, the Einsatzkompanie Gotenhafen, Schutzpolizei and SS carried out expulsions of Poles, whose houses and farms were then handed over to German colonists as part of the Lebensraum policy. Expelled Poles were enslaved as forced labour and sent either to German colonists in the region or to Germany.

== Transport ==
The A1 motorway runs nearby, west of the village.
