= Malenin, Pomeranian Voivodeship =

Village in Pomeranian Voivodeship, Poland

Malenin
- Village
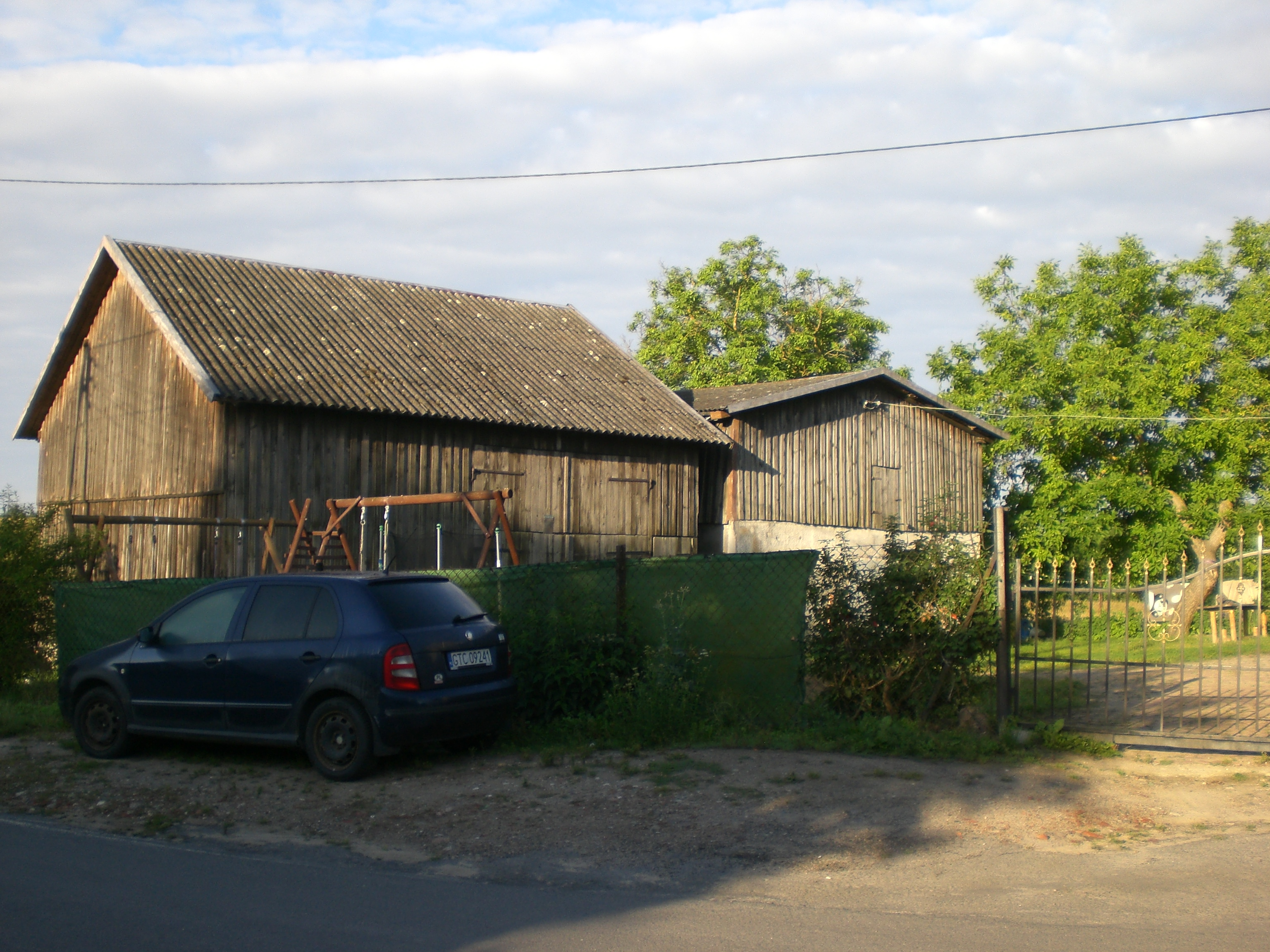

- Location within Poland
- Coordinates: 54°8′7″N 18°41′15″E
- Country: Poland
- Voivodeship: Pomeranian
- County: Tczew
- Gmina: Tczew
- Population: 389
- Time zone: UTC+1 (CET)
  - Summer (DST): UTC+2 (CEST)
- Vehicle registration: GTC

Malenin [maˈlɛnin] is a village in the administrative district of Gmina Tczew, within Tczew County, Pomeranian Voivodeship, in northern Poland. It is located within the ethnocultural region of Kociewie in the historic region of Pomerania.

== History ==
During the Renaissance, Malenin was a private church village of the Diocese of Włocławek, administratively located in Tczew County in the Pomeranian Voivodeship of the Kingdom of Poland.

In 1939, following the German occupation of Poland during World War II, the Germans carried out a massacre of Polish teachers in the village, as part of the Intelligenzaktion.
