= Zajączkowo, Tczew County =

Village in Pomeranian Voivodeship, Poland

Zajączkowo
- Village
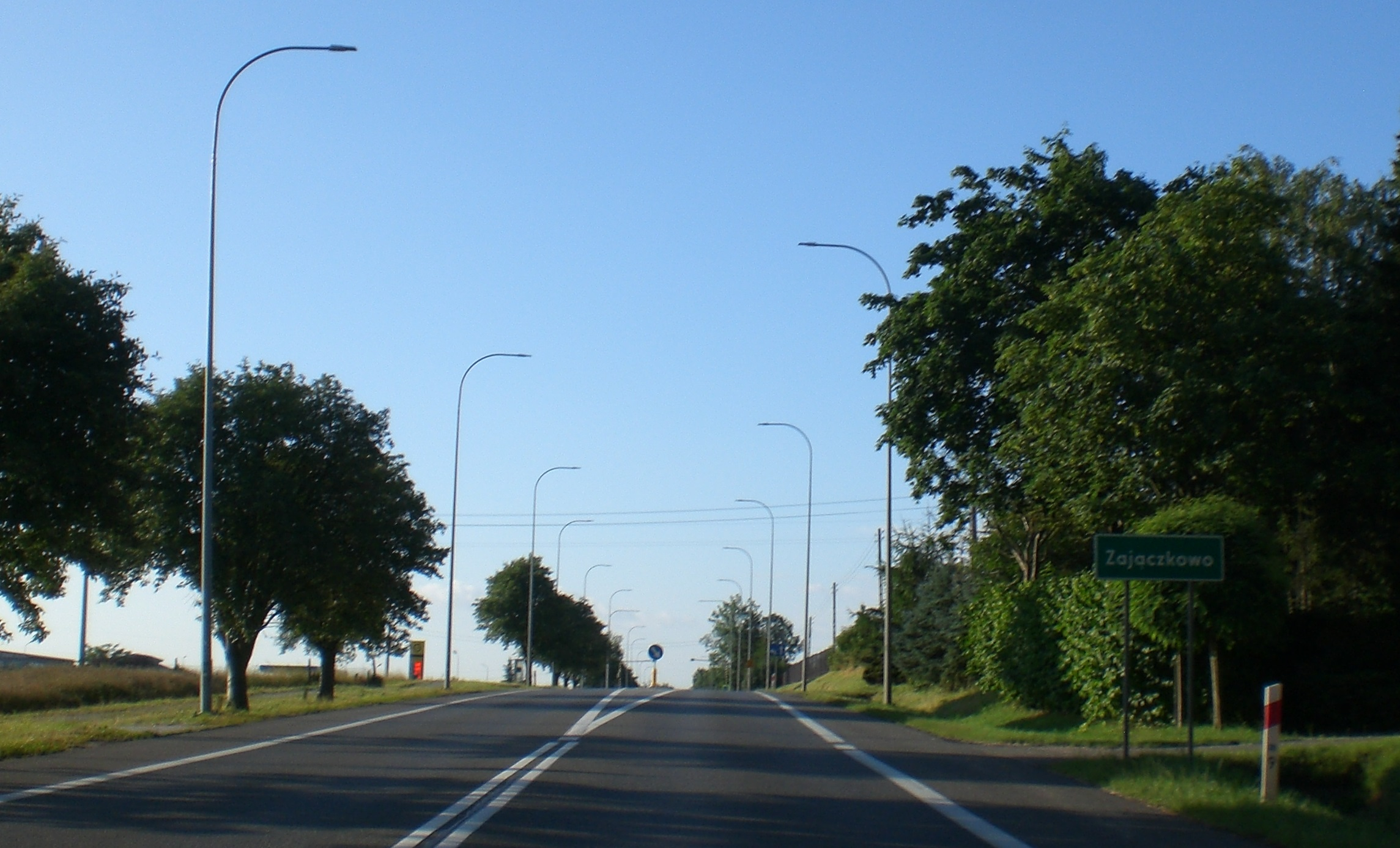

- Location within Poland
- Coordinates: 54°7′14″N 18°43′29″E
- Country: Poland
- Voivodeship: Pomeranian
- County: Tczew
- Gmina: Tczew

Population
  - Total: 439
- Time zone: UTC+1 (CET)
  - Summer (DST): UTC+2 (CEST)
- Vehicle registration: GTC

Zajączkowo [zajɔnt͡ʂˈkɔvɔ] is a village in the administrative district of Gmina Tczew, within Tczew County, Pomeranian Voivodeship, in northern Poland. It is located within the ethnocultural region of Kociewie in the historic region of Pomerania.

Zajączkowo was a royal village of the Polish Crown, administratively located in the Tczew County in the Pomeranian Voivodeship.
