= Rokitki, Tczew County =

Village in Pomeranian Voivodeship, Poland

Rokitki
- Village
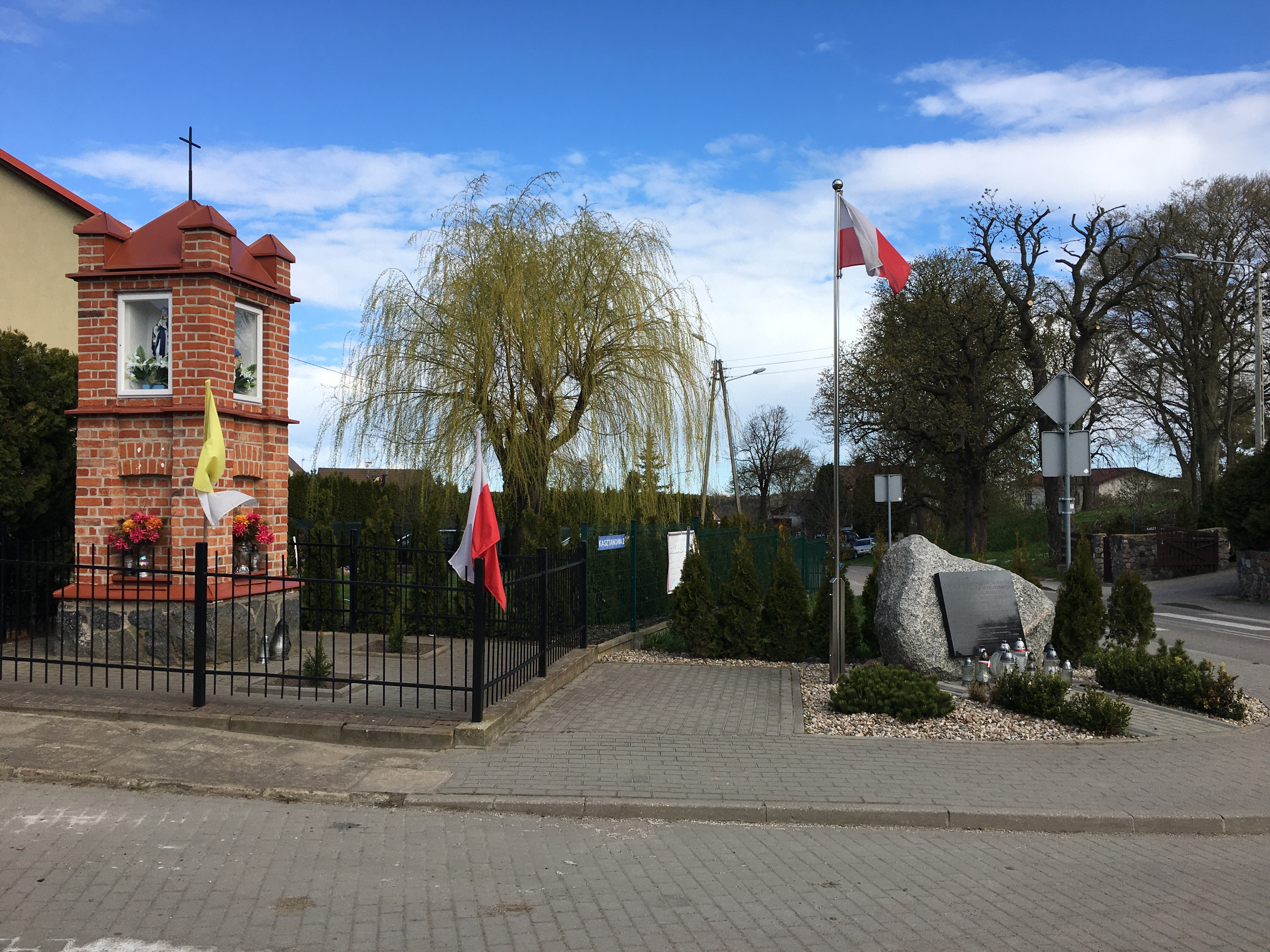

- Location within Poland
- Coordinates: 54°4′43″N 18°44′15″E
- Country: Poland
- Voivodeship: Pomeranian
- County: Tczew
- Gmina: Tczew

Population
  - Total: 1,900
- Time zone: UTC+1 (CET)
  - Summer (DST): UTC+2 (CEST)
- Vehicle registration: GTC

Rokitki [rɔˈkitki] is a village in the administrative district of Gmina Tczew, within Tczew County, Pomeranian Voivodeship, in northern Poland. It is located within the ethnocultural region of Kociewie in the historic region of Pomerania.

== Etymology ==
The name of the village comes from a willow species, known in Polish as wierzba rokita.

== History ==
Rokitki was a royal village of the Polish Crown, administratively located in the Tczew County in the Pomeranian Voivodeship. The Battle of Tczew during the Polish–Swedish War (1626–1629) was fought nearby in August 1627.

During the German occupation of Poland (World War II), in 1939, local Polish activist Paweł Miller was murdered by the Germans in the Szpęgawski Forest along with several Poles from other villages (see Intelligenzaktion), and in 1940 several Polish families were expelled and deported to forced labour, while their farms were handed over to Germans as part of the Lebensraum policy.
