= Rysztówka =

Settlement in Kociewie

- Przysiółek
- Location within Poland
- Coordinates: 54°08′13″N 18°39′48″E
- Country: Poland
- Voivodeship: Pomeranian
- County: Tczew
- Gmina: Tczew
- Time zone: UTC+1 (CET)
  - Summer (DST): CEST
- SIMC: 1003911

Rysztówka is a przysiółek in the administrative district of Gmina Tczew, within Tczew County, Pomeranian Voivodeship, in northern Poland. It is located within the ethnocultural region of Kociewie.
