= Młynki, Tczew County =

Village in Pomeranian Voivodeship, Poland

Młynki
- Settlement
- Location within Poland
- Coordinates: 54°3′14″N 18°40′20″E
- Country: Poland
- Voivodeship: Pomeranian
- County: Tczew
- Gmina: Tczew

Population
  - Total: 33
- Time zone: UTC+1 (CET)
  - Summer (DST): UTC+2 (CEST)
- Vehicle registration: GTC

Młynki [ˈmwɨnki] is a settlement in the administrative district of Gmina Tczew, within Tczew County, Pomeranian Voivodeship, in northern Poland. It is located within the ethnocultural region of Kociewie in the historic region of Pomerania.
