= Małżewo =

Village in Pomeranian Voivodeship, Poland

- Village
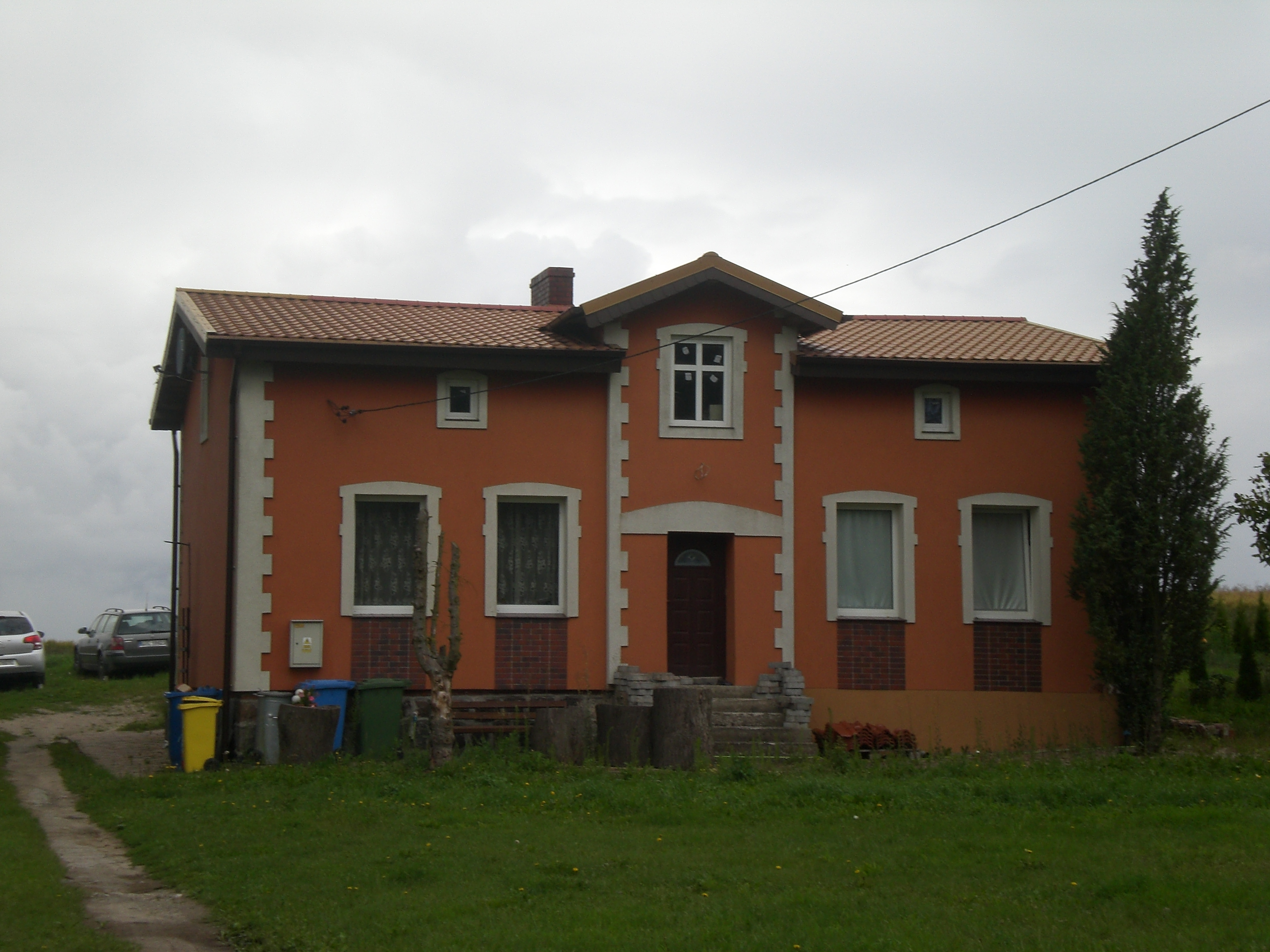

- Location within Poland
- Coordinates: 54°4′45″N 18°37′59″E
- Country: Poland
- Voivodeship: Pomeranian
- County: Tczew
- Gmina: Tczew
- Population: 215
- Time zone: UTC+1 (CET)
  - Summer (DST): UTC+2 (CEST)
- Vehicle registration: GTC

Małżewo [mau̯ˈʐɛvɔ] is a village in the administrative district of Gmina Tczew, within Tczew County, Pomeranian Voivodeship, in northern Poland. It is located within the ethnocultural region of Kociewie in the historic region of Pomerania. About 400 people live in the village.

== History ==
Małżewo was a private village of the Polish nobility, administratively located in the Tczew County in the Pomeranian Voivodeship of the Kingdom of Poland.

During the German occupation of Poland (World War II), in 1941, the Einsatzkompanie Gotenhafen, Schutzpolizei and SS carried out expulsions of Poles, whose houses and farms were then handed over to German colonists as part of the Lebensraum policy. Expelled Poles were enslaved as forced labour and sent either to German colonists in the region or to Germany.

== Transport ==
The A1 motorway runs nearby, east of the village.

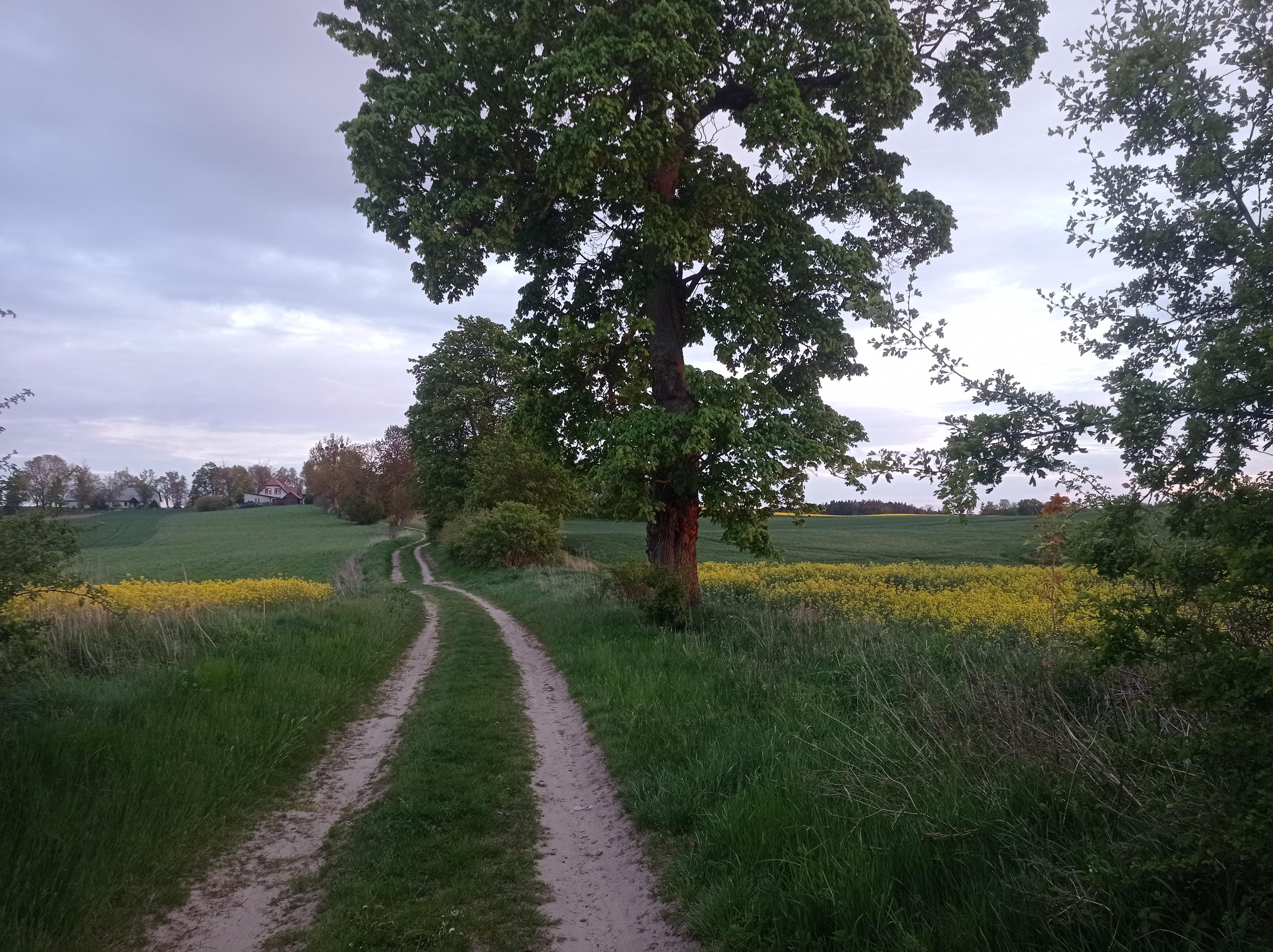
