= Zwierzynek, Pomeranian Voivodeship =

Village in Pomeranian Voivodeship, Poland

Zwierzynek
- Settlement
- Location within Poland
- Coordinates: 54°3′9″N 18°40′55″E
- Country: Poland
- Voivodeship: Pomeranian
- County: Tczew
- Gmina: Tczew

Population
  - Total: 42
- Time zone: UTC+1 (CET)
  - Summer (DST): UTC+2 (CEST)
- Vehicle registration: GTC

Zwierzynek [zvjɛˈʐɨnɛk] is a settlement in the administrative district of Gmina Tczew, within Tczew County, Pomeranian Voivodeship, in northern Poland. It is located in the ethnocultural region of Kociewie in the historical region of Pomerania.
