= Miłobądz, Pomeranian Voivodeship =

Village in Pomeranian Voivodeship, Poland

Miłobądz
- Village
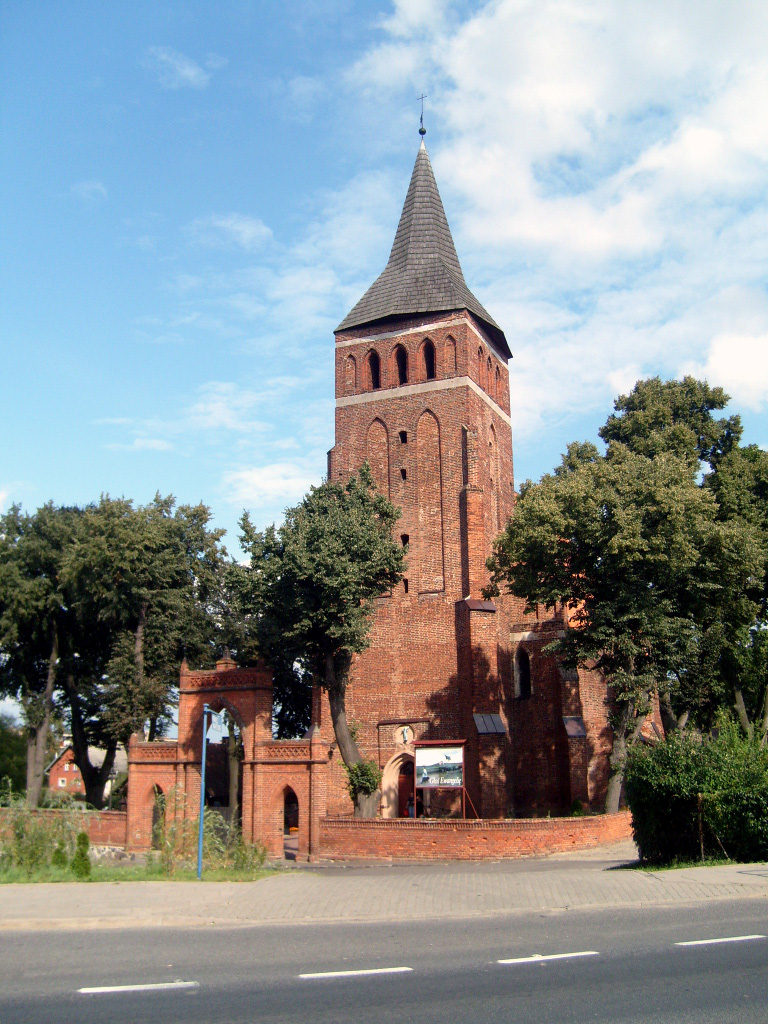
- Saint Mary church in Miłobądz

- Location within Poland
- Coordinates: 54°8′11″N 18°43′13″E
- Country: Poland
- Voivodeship: Pomeranian
- County: Tczew
- Gmina: Tczew
- Population: 979
- Time zone: UTC+1 (CET)
  - Summer (DST): UTC+2 (CEST)
- Vehicle registration: GTC

Miłobądz [miˈwɔbɔnt͡s] is a village in the administrative district of Gmina Tczew, within Tczew County, Pomeranian Voivodeship, in northern Poland. It is located within the ethnocultural region of Kociewie in the historic region of Pomerania.

== History ==
The settlement dates back to prehistoric times and there is a cemetery from the Iron Age in the village, now an archaeological site.

The name of the village comes from the Old Polish male name Miłobąd. It was the site of an early medieval stronghold, which is also an archaeological site. It became part of the emerging Polish state under Poland's first historic ruler Mieszko I in the 10th century.

Within the Crown of the Kingdom of Poland, Miłobądz was a private church village of the Diocese of Włocławek, administratively located in the Tczew County in the Pomeranian Voivodeship.

During the German occupation of Poland (World War II), several Poles from Miłobądz, including teachers, were among the victims of large massacres of Poles carried out by the Germans in the Szpęgawski Forest in 1939 as part of the Intelligenzaktion.

== Education ==
There is a primary school in Miłobądz.

== Transport ==
The Polish National road 91 runs through the village, and Polish Railway line 9, which connects Warsaw with Gdańsk runs nearby, east of the village.
