= Dalwin, Pomeranian Voivodeship =

Village in Pomeranian Voivodeship, Poland

Dalwin
- Village
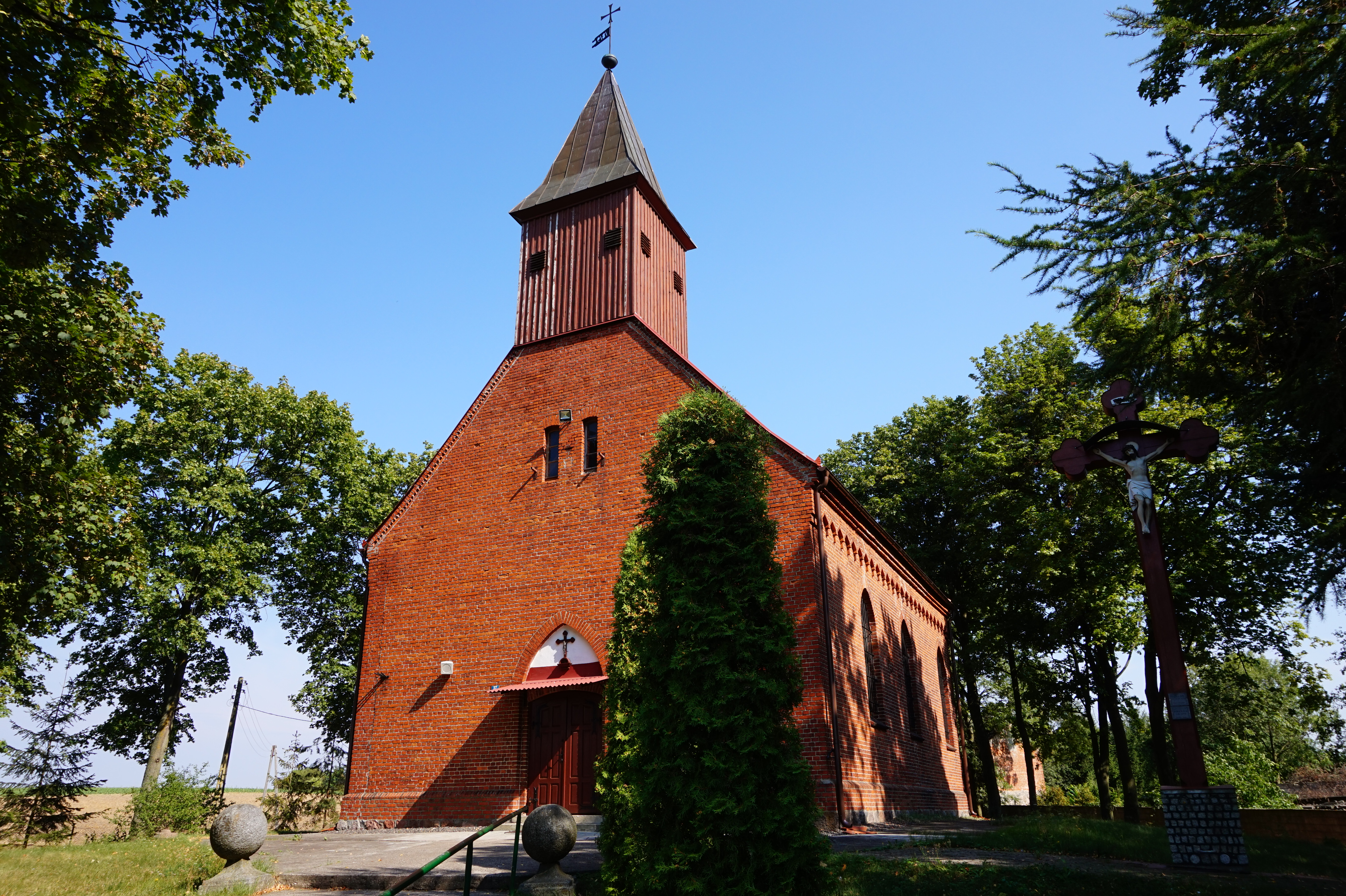
- Saint Nicholas church in Dalwin

- Location within Poland
- Coordinates: 54°6′48″N 18°38′32″E
- Country: Poland
- Voivodeship: Pomeranian
- County: Tczew
- Gmina: Tczew
- Population: 248
- Time zone: UTC+1 (CET)
  - Summer (DST): UTC+2 (CEST)
- Vehicle registration: GTC

Dalwin [ˈdalvin] is a village in the administrative district of Gmina Tczew, within Tczew County, Pomeranian Voivodeship, in northern Poland. It is located within the ethnocultural region of Kociewie in the historic region of Pomerania.

== History ==
Dalwin was a royal village of the Polish Crown, administratively located in the Tczew County in the Pomeranian Voivodeship. It was annexed by Prussia in the First Partition of Poland in 1772, and restored to Poland, after Poland regained independence in 1918.

During the German occupation of Poland (World War II), in 1941, the Einsatzkompanie Gotenhafen, Schutzpolizei and SS carried out expulsions of Poles, whose houses and farms were then handed over to German colonists as part of the Lebensraum policy. Expelled Poles were enslaved as forced labour and sent either to German colonists in the region or to Germany.

== Transport ==
The A1 motorway runs nearby, east of the village.
