= Knybawa =

Village in Pomeranian Voivodeship, Poland

- Colony
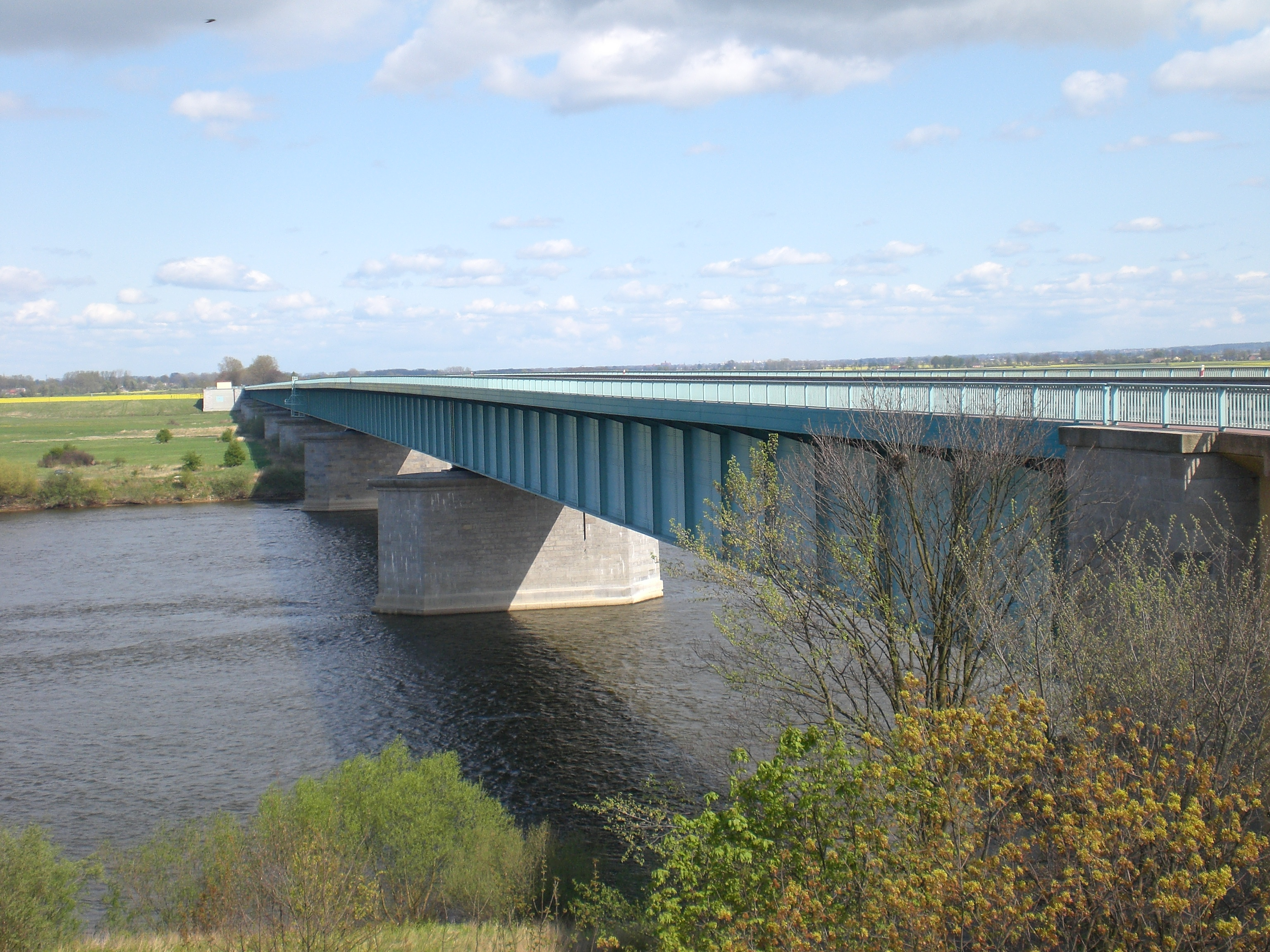
- View of the Knybawa Bridge which spans the Vistula

- Location within Poland
- Coordinates: 54°3′29″N 18°48′32″E
- Country: Poland
- Voivodeship: Pomeranian
- County: Tczew
- Gmina: Tczew

Population
  - Total: 185
- Time zone: UTC+1 (CET)
  - Summer (DST): UTC+2 (CEST)
- Vehicle registration: GTC

Knybawa [knɨˈbava] is a colony in the administrative district of Gmina Tczew, within Tczew County, Pomeranian Voivodeship, in northern Poland. It is located within the ethnocultural region of Kociewie in the historic region of Pomerania.
