= Czatkowy =

Village in Pomeranian Voivodeship, Poland

- Village
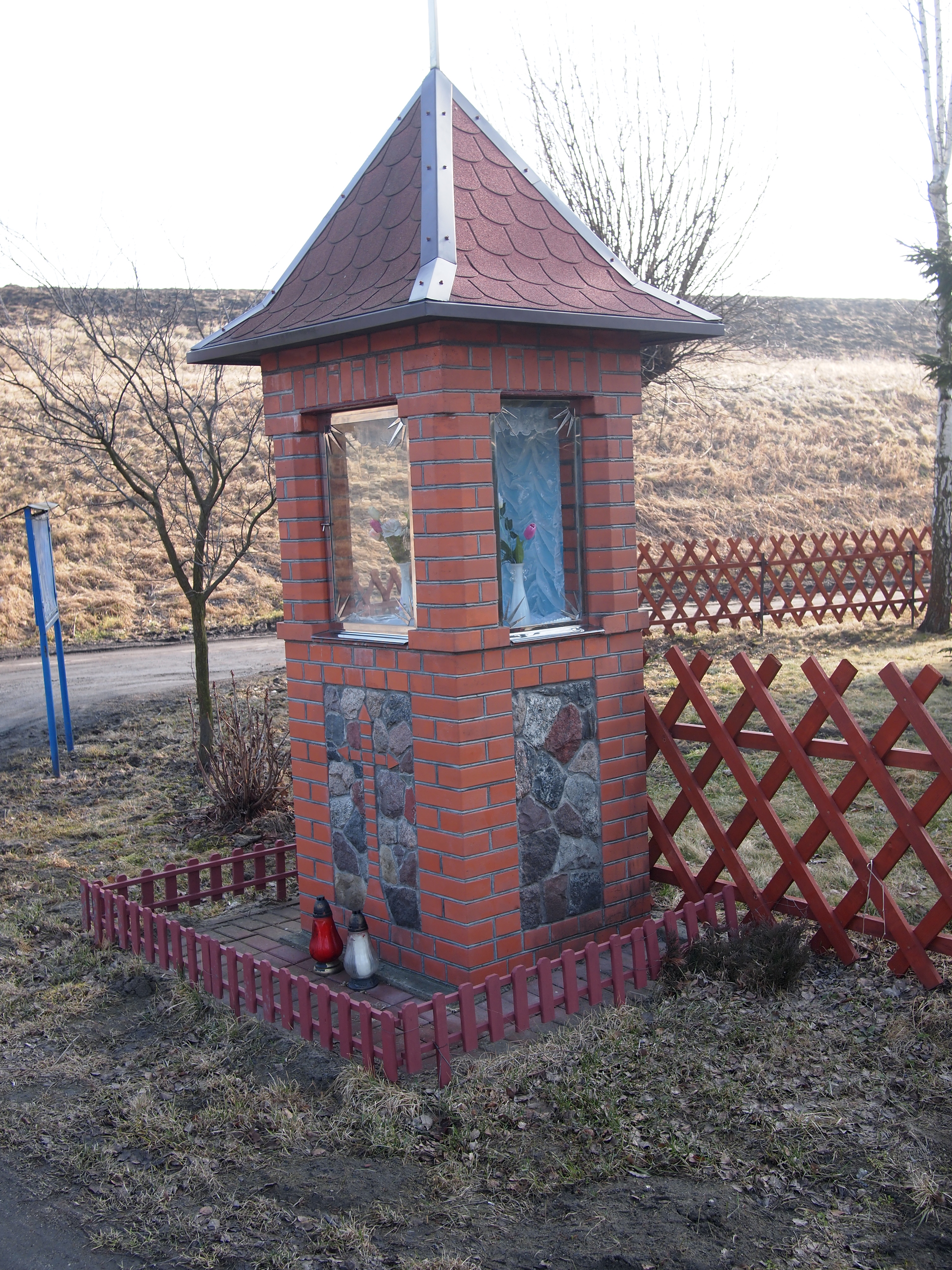
- Wayside shrine in Czatkowy

- Location within Poland
- Coordinates: 54°7′49″N 18°48′53″E
- Country: Poland
- Voivodeship: Pomeranian
- County: Tczew
- Gmina: Tczew
- Population: 372
- Time zone: UTC+1 (CET)
  - Summer (DST): UTC+2 (CEST)
- Vehicle registration: GTC

Czatkowy [t͡ʂatˈkɔvɨ] is a village in the administrative district of Gmina Tczew, within Tczew County, Pomeranian Voivodeship, in northern Poland. It is located within the ethnocultural region of Kociewie in the historic region of Pomerania.

The Czatkowy Lake is located in the village.

Czatkowy was a private church village of the monastery in Pelplin, administratively located in the Tczew County in the Pomeranian Voivodeship of the Kingdom of Poland.

== Notable people ==
- Edwin Rozenkranz (1925–1992), Polish lawyer and professor of the University of Gdańsk, participant of the Polish Warsaw Uprising during the German occupation of Poland (World War II)
