= Małe Turze =

Village in Pomeranian Voivodeship, Poland

- Village
- Location within Poland
- Coordinates: 54°5′58″N 18°36′31″E
- Country: Poland
- Voivodeship: Pomeranian
- County: Tczew
- Gmina: Tczew
- Time zone: UTC+1 (CET)
  - Summer (DST): UTC+2 (CEST)
- Vehicle registration: GTC

Małe Turze [ˈmawɛ ˈtuʐɛ] is a village in the administrative district of Gmina Tczew, within Tczew County, Pomeranian Voivodeship, in northern Poland. It is located within the ethnocultural region of Kociewie in the historic region of Pomerania.
