= Koziary, Pomeranian Voivodeship =

Village in Pomeranian Voivodeship, Poland

Koziary
- Settlement
- Location within Poland
- Coordinates: 54°3′28″N 18°40′25″E
- Country: Poland
- Voivodeship: Pomeranian
- County: Tczew
- Gmina: Tczew
- Time zone: UTC+1 (CET)
  - Summer (DST): UTC+2 (CEST)
- Vehicle registration: GTC

Koziary [kɔˈʑarɨ] is a settlement in the administrative district of Gmina Tczew, within Tczew County, Pomeranian Voivodeship, in northern Poland. It is located within the ethnocultural region of Kociewie in the historic region of Pomerania.
