= Gniszewo =

Village in Pomeranian Voivodeship, Poland

- Village
- Location within Poland
- Coordinates: 54°2′49″N 18°44′10″E
- Country: Poland
- Voivodeship: Pomeranian
- County: Tczew
- Gmina: Tczew

Population
  - Total: 313
- Time zone: UTC+1 (CET)
  - Summer (DST): UTC+2 (CEST)
- Vehicle registration: GTC

Gniszewo [ɡniˈʂɛvɔ] is a village in the administrative district of Gmina Tczew, within Tczew County, Pomeranian Voivodeship, in northern Poland. It is located within the ethnocultural region of Kociewie in the historic region of Pomerania.

== History ==
Gniszewo was a royal village of the Kingdom of Poland, administratively located in the Tczew County in the Pomeranian Voivodeship. It was annexed by Prussia in the First Partition of Poland in 1772, and restored to Poland, after Poland regained independence in 1918.

During the German occupation of Poland (World War II), the Germans expelled several Poles, whose farms were then handed over to German colonists as part of the Lebensraum policy.
