= Szpęgawa =

Village in Pomeranian Voivodeship, Poland

- Village
- Location within Poland
- Coordinates: 54°5′52″N 18°44′2″E
- Country: Poland
- Voivodeship: Pomeranian
- County: Tczew
- Gmina: Tczew
- Population: 638
- Time zone: UTC+1 (CET)
  - Summer (DST): UTC+2 (CEST)
- Vehicle registration: GTC

Szpęgawa [ʂpɛnˈɡava] is a village in the administrative district of Gmina Tczew, within Tczew County, Pomeranian Voivodeship, in northern Poland. It is located within the ethnocultural region of Kociewie in the historic region of Pomerania.

== History ==
Szpęgawa was a private church village of the monastery in Pelplin, administratively located in the Tczew County in the Pomeranian Voivodeship of the Kingdom of Poland.

During the German occupation of Poland (World War II), in 1939–1940, several Poles from Szpęgawa, including a teenage boy, were among the victims of large massacres of Poles carried out by the Germans in the Szpęgawski Forest as part of the Intelligenzaktion. In January 1945, a German-perpetrated death march of Allied prisoners-of-war from the Stalag XX-B POW camp passed through the village.

== Transport ==
The Polish Voivodeship road 224 runs through the village, and the A1 motorway runs nearby, west of the village.
