= Czarlin =

Village in Pomeranian Voivodeship, Poland

- Village
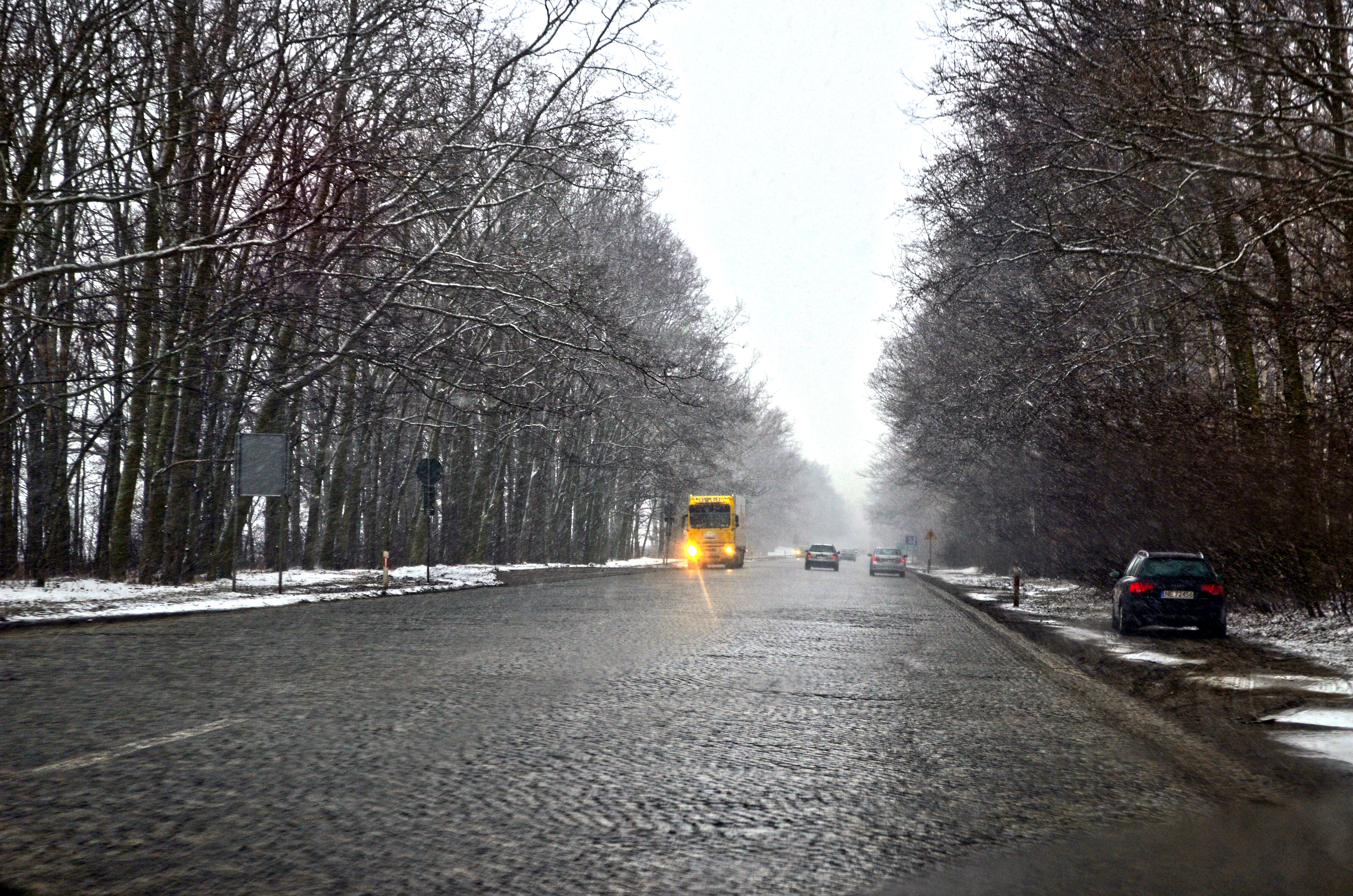

- Location within Poland
- Coordinates: 54°2′54″N 18°45′39″E
- Country: Poland
- Voivodeship: Pomeranian
- County: Tczew
- Gmina: Tczew
- Population: 940
- Time zone: UTC+1 (CET)
  - Summer (DST): UTC+2 (CEST)
- Vehicle registration: GTC

Czarlin [ˈt͡ʂarlin] is a village in the administrative district of Gmina Tczew, within Tczew County, Pomeranian Voivodeship, in northern Poland. It is located within the ethnocultural region of Kociewie in the historic region of Pomerania.

== History ==
Czarlin was a private village of Polish nobility, administratively located in the Tczew County in the Pomeranian Voivodeship of the Kingdom of Poland. It was the ancestral seat of the Czarliński noble family.

During the German occupation of Poland (World War II), in 1939–1941, the occupiers carried out expulsions of Poles, whose farms were then handed over to German colonists as part of the Lebensraum policy. Expelled Poles were either deported to the General Government in the more eastern part of German-occupied Poland or enslaved as forced labour and sent to German colonists in the area or to Germany. In 1942, the occupiers renamed the village to Schedlin in attempt to erase traces of Polish origin. In 1945, the occupation ended and the historic Polish name was restored.

== Transport ==
Czarlin is located at the intersection of National roads 22 and 91, and there is also a train station there.
