= Bałdowo =

Village in Pomeranian Voivodeship, Poland

- Village
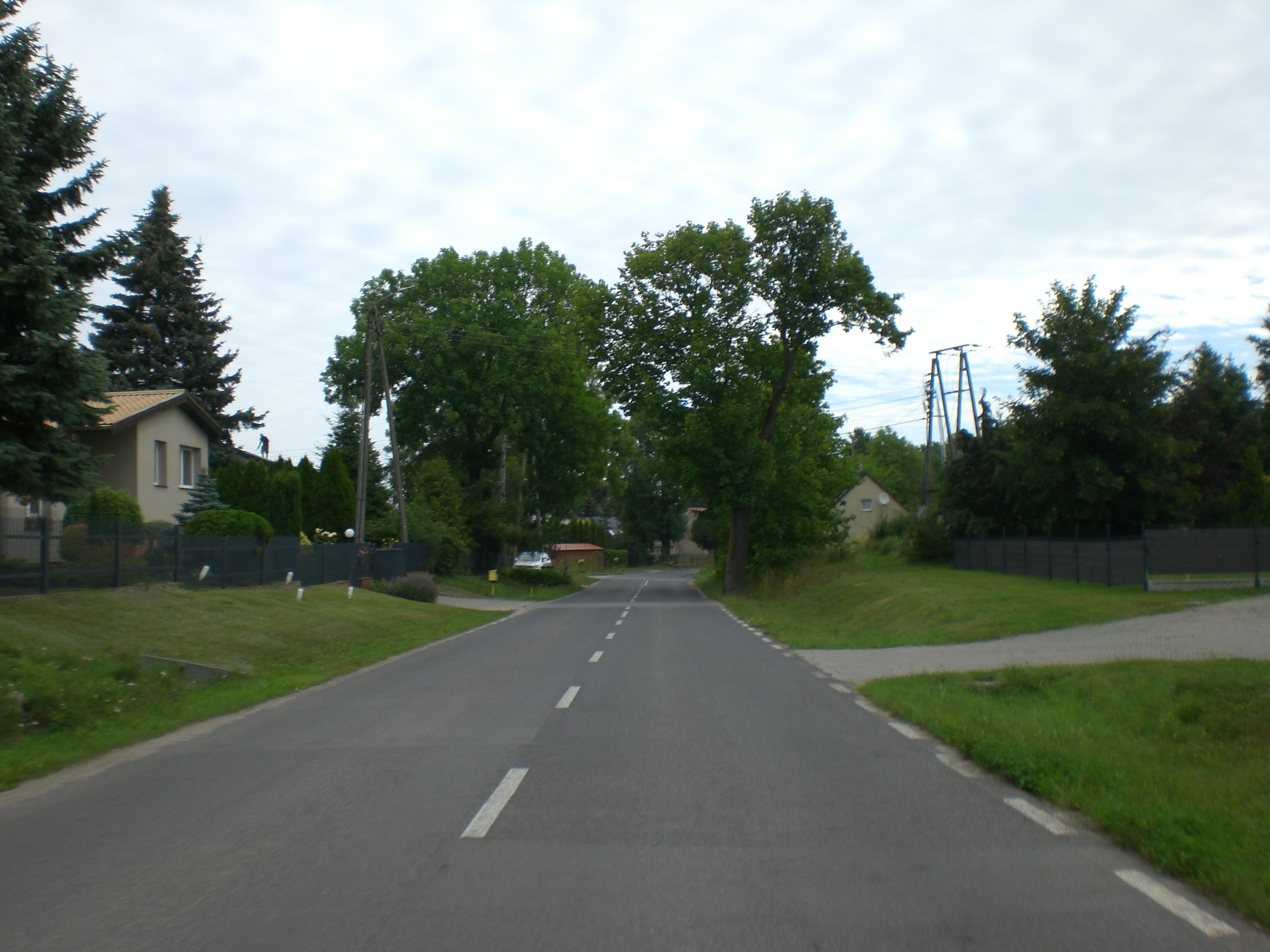

- Location within Poland
- Coordinates: 54°3′23″N 18°47′35″E
- Country: Poland
- Voivodeship: Pomeranian
- County: Tczew
- Gmina: Tczew

Population
  - Total: 653
- Time zone: UTC+1 (CET)
  - Summer (DST): UTC+2 (CEST)
- Vehicle registration: GTC

Bałdowo [bau̯ˈdɔvɔ] is a village in the administrative district of Gmina Tczew, within Tczew County, Pomeranian Voivodeship, in northern Poland. It is located in the ethnocultural region of Kociewie in the historic region of Pomerania.
