= Dąbrówka Tczewska =

Village in Pomeranian Voivodeship, Poland

- Village
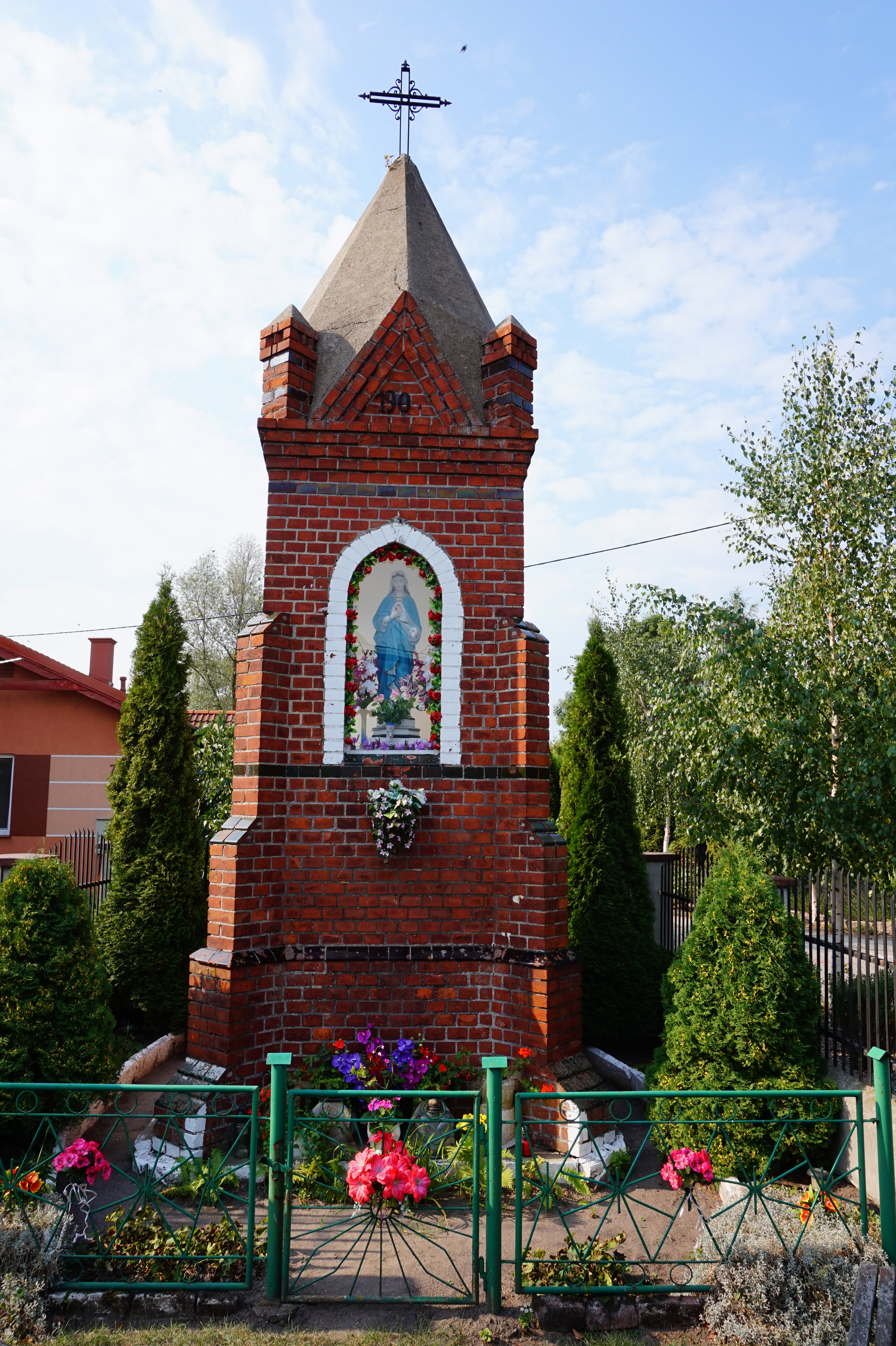
- A wayside shrine in the village centre

- Location within Poland
- Coordinates: 54°6′44″N 18°43′36″E
- Country: Poland
- Voivodeship: Pomeranian
- County: Tczew
- Gmina: Tczew
- Population: 608
- Time zone: UTC+1 (CET)
  - Summer (DST): UTC+2 (CEST)
- ISO 3166 code: POL
- Vehicle registration: GTC

Dąbrówka Tczewska [dɔmˈbrufka ˈtt͡ʂɛfska] is a village in the administrative district of Gmina Tczew, within Tczew County, Pomeranian Voivodeship, in northern Poland. It is located within the ethnocultural region of Kociewie in the historic region of Pomerania.
