= Subkowy Dworzec =

Settlement in Kociewie

- Hamlet
- Location within Poland
- Coordinates: 53°58′46″N 18°45′37″E
- Country: Poland
- Voivodeship: Pomeranian
- County: Tczew
- Gmina: Subkowy
- Postal code: 83-120
- SIMC: 0174361

Subkowy Dworzec [supˈkɔvɨ ˈdvɔʐɛt͡s] is a hamlet in the administrative district of Gmina Subkowy, within Tczew County, Pomeranian Voivodeship, in northern Poland. The settlement lies within the ethnocultural region of Kociewie.
