= Battle of Dirschau =

1627 battle

- Part of the Polish–Swedish War (1626–29)
Date	7–8 August 1627 (Swedish calendar); 17–18 August 1627 (N.S.)
Location	Tczew, Royal Prussia (Crown of the Kingdom of Poland) 54°05′29.99″N 18°46′38.31″E
Result	See aftermath

Belligerents
Polish–Lithuanian Commonwealth	Swedish Empire

Commanders and leaders
(Polish–Lithuanian Commonwealth) Stanisław Koniecpolski	(Swedish Empire) Gustavus Adolphus (WIA)

Strength
3,300 (infantry); 4,500 (cavalry); Total: 7,800	6,000 (infantry); 4,100 (cavalry); Total: 10,100

The Battle of Dirschau (also known as Battle of Tczew) took place in the summer of 1627 (17–18 August) and was one of the battles of the Polish–Swedish War (1626–29). The Polish forces led by Crown Field Hetman Stanisław Koniecpolski met with troops commanded by Swedish King Gustavus Adolphus of Sweden. Gustavus Adolphus was wounded in the battle, which ended inconclusively. Fighting in Prussia ended in a stalemate for that year, and would not resume until 1628.

== Background ==
In the summer of 1626 the Swedes invaded Pomerania and the Duchy of Prussia, taking Pillau (Baltiysk, Piława). The fighting spread, marked by a number of Swedish successes that year against the forces of the Polish king Sigismund III Vasa. In October, the Polish forces in the region were reinforced by the army of Crown Field Hetman Stanisław Koniecpolski, relocated from the south-eastern border of the Polish–Lithuanian Commonwealth. Koniecpolski was able to slow down the Swedes and retake some territory, notably Puck (March), and defeated the Swedes at the Battle of Hammerstein (also known as Battle of Czarne) in April. In May 1627 Swedish King Gustavus Adolphus of Sweden reinforced his units, attacking the Polish-Lithuanian Commonwealth in Pomerania. Polish forces, commanded by hetman Koniecpolski, numbered under 15,000. In the summer of 1627 Koniecpolski decided to advance to the major port of Pomerania, Gdańsk .

Both Koniecpolski and Gustav II Adolf desired a major battle. Koniecpolski needed to reduce the Swedes' strength, as their current numerical superiority made it difficult for his army to contain them; Gustav II Adolf meanwhile heard rumors of possible reinforcements for Koniecpolski arriving, and wanted to defeat him before his numerical superiority withered.

== Opposing forces ==
The Polish army numbered 7,800, including 2,500 hussars and reiters, 2,000 Cossack light cavalry, 3,000 infantry (including 2,000 German mercenaries), and 300 artillery personnel. The Swedes were 10,100 strong, including about 6,000 infantry and 4,000 cavalry. The Swedes had also a significant advantage in artillery. Gustavus Adolphus arranged his cavalry into three groups: right wing under colonel count Thurn, middle commanded by himself, and left under field marshal Herman Wrangel.

== Battle ==
The field of battle consisted primarily of swamp of the Motława (Mottlau), with two levees passing through it. The Swedes were gathered south of Tczew; Poles - north of it. Gustavus Adolphus planned to provoke the Poles to charge through the levee, and break them with artillery and infantry fire.

Before the main battle, when Gustavus Adolphus was scouting the battlefield, he was ambushed by a Polish unit which chased him back to his camp. The main battle began some time later, before noon on 7 August, with a charge of the Swedish cavalry, which pushed the Polish forces back. Koniecpolski responded with a counterattack, and the Swedes retreated to the camp; Koniecpolski however was too cautious to attack it. For a while, both armies were at a stalemate, with neither willing to advance and engage the opponent; eventually Koniecpolski begun to pull his forces back through the levee to his own camp. The Swedes charged the withdrawing Poles, and were able to disorganize the Polish cavalry, inflicting painful casualties (about 200-300) before being stopped by Polish infantry. Komiecpolski's horse was wounded and captured by the Swedes, which led them to suspect the Polish commander died. Thus Gustav II Adolf prepared a major assault for the following day.

On the morning of 8 August the Swedes began shelling the Polish positions and their artillery advantage resulted in a steady retreat of the Polish forces from their advance positions near the village of Rokitki (Rokittken). Eventually the Polish army was back in its main camp, and under artillery fire. Gustavus Adolphus decided to scout the field again before the final assault but was spotted by the Poles. He was targeted by infantry marksmen, who managed to wound him in the neck and arm, dropping him from the horse. With their commander wounded, the Swedes decided not to press the assault despite their very advantageous position.

== Aftermath ==
From a strategic point of view the battle ended with a Polish victory, but it was still a draw since the first day of the battle ended with a Swedish victory. But the Poles prevented the Swedes from achieving their aim, and stopped the Swedes from taking more aggressive actions by taking advantage of their numerical superiority. The time gained also allowed Danzig to finish the construction of fortifications, which would be ready in spring of 1628. Overall, the campaign of 1627, ending with the Battle of Oliwa, was a Polish success.

The wound Gustavus Adolphus received would put him in bed until autumn, and his right arm was weakened with some fingers partially paralyzed. Until 1628 both sides would focus on consolidating their position without any major actions.

In the battle Gustavus Adolphus tested a new tactic, making his cavalry more aggressive, and charging into melee combat. This proved to be a major success, significantly responsible for the Swedish victory on the first day; this was particularly notable, as it marked the first time that the Swedish cavalry was able to take on the Polish cavalry, renowned at the time as the "best cavalry in Europe" according to English historian Michael Roberts. The factor that enabled the Swedish cavalry to achieve this success was the accompanying musketeers, with whom Gustavus Adolphus mixed his cavalry. Further, Gustavus experimented with new artillery units and introduced a reorganization of infantry which would give birth to the brigade unit.

== Bibliography ==
- Podhorodecki, Leszek (1978). Stanisław Koniecpolski ok. 1592–1646. Warszawa: Wydawnictwo Ministerstwa Obrony Narodowej.
