= Gmina Tczew =

Gmina Tczew Tczew Commune
- Gmina
- Coat of arms
- Interactive map of Gmina Tczew
- Coordinates (Tczew): 54°6′N 18°43′E
- Country: Poland
- Voivodeship: Pomeranian
- County: Tczew
- Seat: Tczew

Area
  - Total: 170.61 km^{2} (65.87 sq mi)

Population (2022)
  - Total: 15,094
  - Density: 88.471/km^{2} (229.14/sq mi)
- Website: http://www.gmina-tczew.pl

Gmina Tczew is a rural gmina (administrative district) in Tczew County, Pomeranian Voivodeship, in northern Poland. Its seat is the town of Tczew, although the town is not part of the territory of the gmina.

The gmina covers an area of 170.61 square kilometres (65.9 sq mi), and as of 2022 its total population is 15,094.

== Villages ==
Gmina Tczew contains the villages and settlements of Bałdowo, Bojary, Boroszewo, Czarlin, Czatkowy, Dąbrówka Tczewska, Dalwin, Damaszka, Gniszewo, Goszyn, Knybawa, Koziary, Lądy, Liniewko, Lubiszewo Tczewskie, Łukocin, Małe Rokitki, Małe Turze, Malenin, Małżewko, Małżewo, Mieścin, Miłobądz, Miłobądz Mały, Młynki, Owczarki, Piwnice, Polesie, Rokitki, Rukosin, Rysztówka, Śliwiny, Stanisławie, Swarożyn, Świetlikowo, Szczerbięcin, Szpęgawa, Tczewskie Łąki, Turze, Waćmierek, Wędkowy, Zabagno, Zajączkowo, Zajączkowo-Dworzec, Zajączkowo-Wybudowanie and Zwierzynek.

== Neighbouring gminas ==
Gmina Tczew is bordered by the town of Tczew and by the gminas of Lichnowy, Miłoradz, Pszczółki, Skarszewy, Starogard Gdański, Subkowy, Suchy Dąb and Trąbki Wielkie.
