= Colony (Poland) =

Type of settlement in Poland

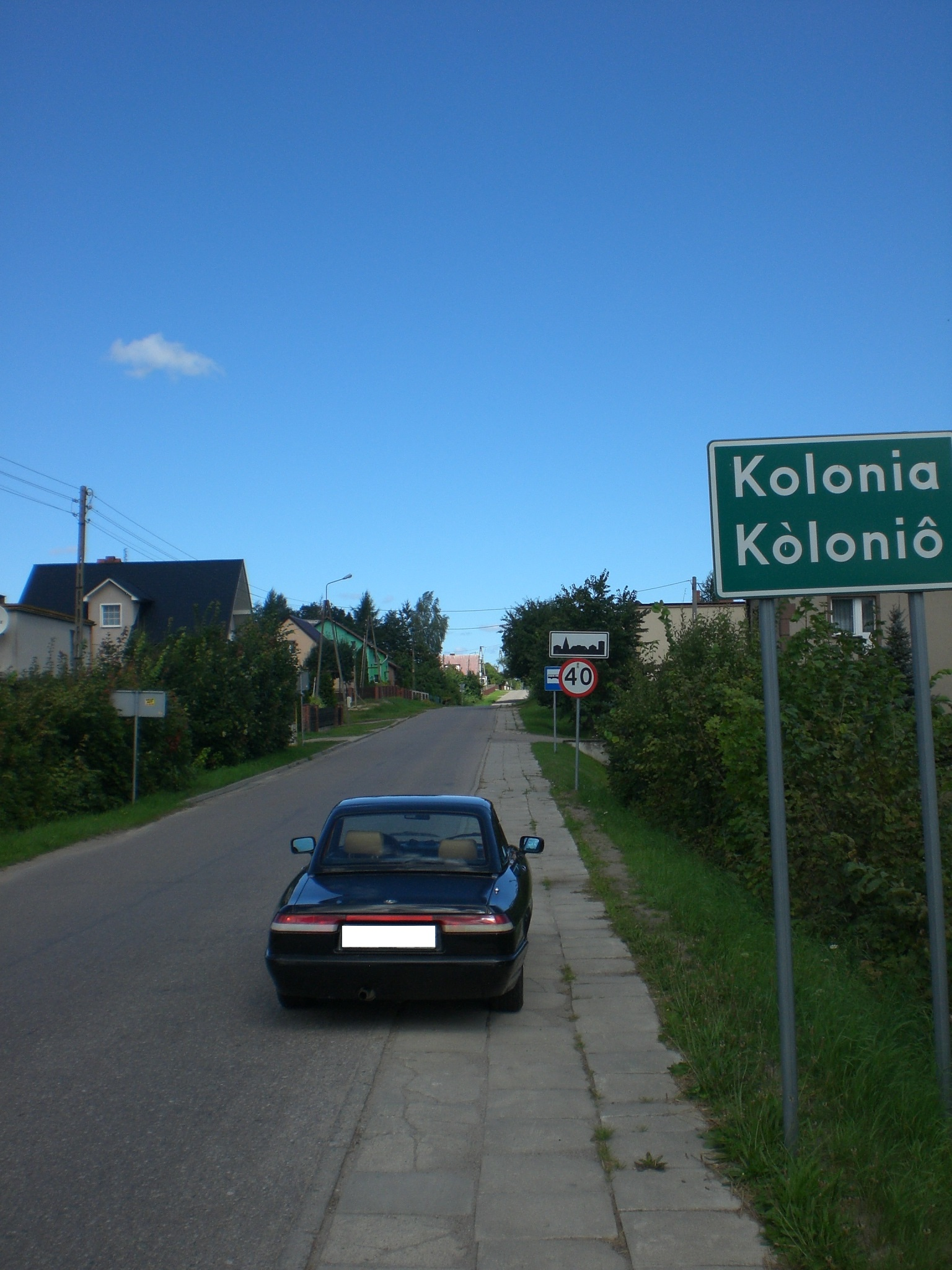
A bilingual Polish-Kashubian roadsign for the settlement of Kolonia

A colony (Polish: kolonia) in Polish law, is a settlement created due to the expansion of other settlements, usually towns and villages, that is located away from previously existing buildings. It can be counted as a separate settlement rather than part of a previously existing one.

== See also ==
- Przysiółek
- Kolonia (disambiguation)
