= Tczew County =

County of Kociewie

Tczew County Powiat Tczewski
- County
- Flag Coat of arms

- Location within Poland
- Coordinates (Tczew): 54°6′N 18°43′E
- Country: Poland
- Voivodeship: Pomeranian
- Seat: Tczew
- Gminas: Total 6 (incl. 1 urban): Tczew; Gmina Gniew; Gmina Morzeszczyn; Gmina Pelplin; Gmina Subkowy; Gmina Tczew

Area
  - Total: 697.54 km^{2} (269.32 sq mi)

Population (2019)
  - Total: 115,738
  - Density: 165.92/km^{2} (429.74/sq mi)
  - Urban: 74,611
  - Rural: 41,127
- Car plates: GTC
- Website: www.powiat.tczew.pl

Tczew County (Polish: Powiat Tczewski) is a unit of territorial administration and local government (powiat) in Pomeranian Voivodeship, northern Poland. It came into being on January 1, 1999, as a result of the Polish local government reforms passed in 1998. Its administrative seat and largest town is Tczew, which lies 31 kilometres (19 mi) south of the regional capital Gdańsk. The county also contains the towns of Pelplin, lying 20 km (12 mi) south of Tczew, and Gniew, 31 km (19 mi) south of Tczew. The county is part of the area traditionally inhabited by the Kocievians ethnic group.

The county covers an area of 697.54 square kilometres (269.3 sq mi). As of 2019 its total population is 115,738, out of which the population of Tczew is 60,120, that of Pelplin is 7,784, that of Gniew is 6,707, and the rural population is 41,127.

Tczew County on a map of the counties of Pomeranian Voivodeship

Tczew County is bordered by Gdańsk County to the north, Malbork County, Sztum County and Kwidzyn County to the east, Świecie County to the south, and Starogard County to the west.

== Administrative divisions ==
The county is subdivided into six gminas (one urban, two urban-rural and three rural). These are listed in the following table, in descending order of population.

Gmina	Type	Area (km^{2})	Population (2019)	Seat
Tczew	urban	22.3	60,120	
Gmina Pelplin	urban-rural	140.5	16,238	Pelplin
Gmina Gniew	urban-rural	194.8	15,471	Gniew
Gmina Tczew	rural	170.6	14,798	Tczew *
Gmina Subkowy	rural	78.2	5,466	Subkowy
Gmina Morzeszczyn	rural	91.2	3,645	Morzeszczyn
* seat not part of the gmina
