= Andrzej Gąsiorowski =

Polish historian (1950–2026)

- Born: 18 December 1950; Subkowy, Gdańsk Voivodeship, Polish People's Republic
- Died: 7 August 2026 (aged 75)
- Education: UG; UMK
- Occupation: Academic
- Known for: Forensic investigation into the massacres in Piaśnica
- Awards: Gold Cross of Merit

Andrzej Gąsiorowski (18 December 1950 – 7 August 2026) was a Polish historian and research scientist at the Stutthof concentration camp Museum in Sztutowo. He was Professor in the Institute of Politology, Faculty of Social Sciences of the University of Gdańsk, and awarded the title of profesor zwyczajny by the President of Poland, Bronisław Komorowski. He served as President of the Regional Commission of the Institute of National Remembrance in Gdańsk and was the President of the Scientific Advisory to the Baltic Institute. Gąsiorowski specialised in the World War II history of Poland, with a focus on the anti-Nazi resistance in Pomerania. He was the author of books and monographs on this subject including genocidal operations against Poles by Nazi Germany, such as the Intelligenzaktion and the massacres in Piaśnica.

== Life and career ==
Gąsiorowski was born in Subkowy, Gdańsk Voivodeship on 18 December 1950. He graduated from the Department of History of the University of Gdańsk's Faculty of Humanism, and received his doctorate in 1979. He habilitated in 2000 at the Faculty of Historical Sciences of the Nicolaus Copernicus University in Toruń. He was a member of the Council for the Protection of Struggle and Martyrdom Sites in Gdańsk. Gąsiorowski was the author and co-author of books devoted to Gdańsk Pomerania, notably to the underground paramilitary Grey Ranks, and Polish underground Navy in 1939–1945.

Gąsiorowski died on 7 August 2026, at the age of 75.

== Works ==
- Pomorze Gdańskie w świetle wydawnictw konspiracyjnych 1939-1945,
- Szare Szeregi na Pomorzu w latach 1939-1945, ISBN 839056596X, published in 1998
- Polska Armia Powstania. Największa tajemnica konspiracji pomorskiej, ISBN 8390565935, published in 1997
- Wydział Marynarki Wojennej Komendy Głównej AK kryptonim "Alfa", ISBN 8388693158, published in 2001

== Sources ==
- Andrzej Gąsiorowski in libraries (WorldCat catalog)
