= Kujawsko-Pomorska Digital Library =

Within the framework of Scientific Libraries Consortium of Kujawsko-Pomorski Region, Nicolaus Copernicus University Library in Toruń has started a long-term enterprise of building a digital library called Kujawsko-Pomorska Digital Library. The project implementation was financed by EU Structural Funds and first collections are to be created in the years 2005-2006. At the end of 2006 the collections were accessed.

The main aim of the project is to create a regional digital library to support the development of an intellectual and innovative potential of the society, to make a quick access to information and knowledge content possible, and to protect valuable documents of the region and national literature works. The project was innovative and experimental, as concerns Polish libraries (one of the first ones in Poland).

Project participants in expenses and its implementation:

- Nicolaus Copernicus University Library in Toruń – the coordinator of the project;
- NCU Collegium Medicum Library in Bydgoszcz - partner;
- Kazimierz Wielki University Library in Bydgoszcz – partner.

As well as remaining libraries of Scientific Libraries Consortium of Kujawsko-Pomorski Region, which will use and develop the project.

Following groups of collections:

- Science Collection – including digital copies of selected handbooks, monographs and scientific articles from the region.
- Cultural Heritage Collection – including digital copies of the most valuable and used items: incunabula, old prints, manuscripts, iconographical collections, cartographical items, emigrational collections, etc.
- Regional Collection – collecting digital copies of: regional publications, leaflets, posters, playbills, photographs, invitations, exhibition catalogues and trade fairs of the region.
- Music Collection – digital copies of scores.
- Maps Collection – digital copies of selected maps of the region.

Kujawsko-Pomorska Digital Library is to serve scientists, students, pupils and all the citizens of the region. Its implementation will depend on all librarians engaged in the project and the authors, who would want to place their works in a digital library. In the future it will depend also on institutions, which would wish to enlarge its holdings of other collections important for the region. Nicolaus Copernicus University Library is opened for each good proposal towards enriching digital base of this digital library.

== See also ==
- List of digital library projects
- Nicolaus Copernicus University in Toruń
- Kazimierz Wielki University in Bydgoszcz
- List of libraries in Poland
