= Narkowy =

Village in Pomeranian Voivodeship, Poland

- Village
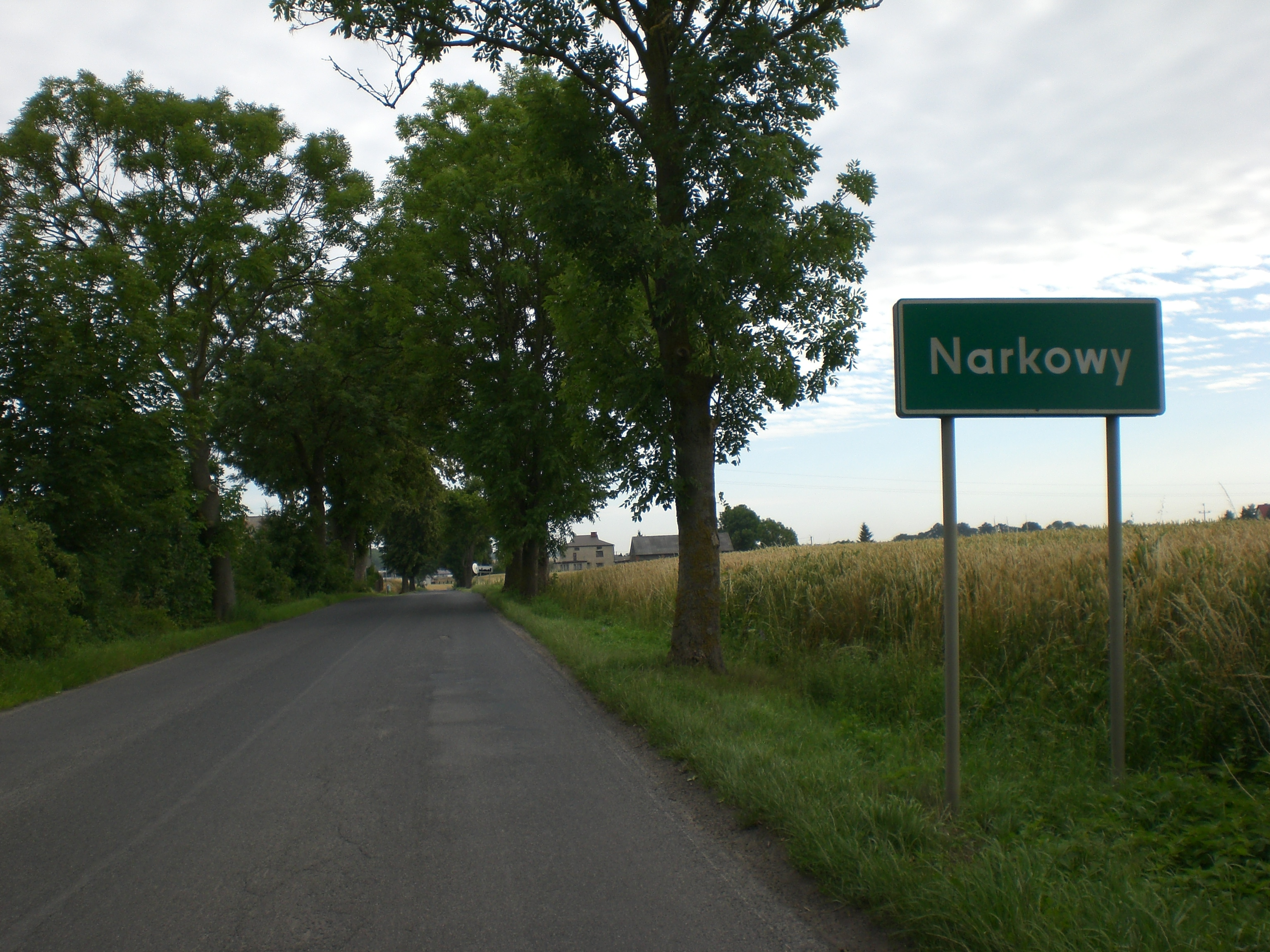

- Location within Poland
- Coordinates: 54°2′2″N 18°46′50″E
- Country: Poland
- Voivodeship: Pomeranian
- County: Tczew
- Gmina: Subkowy
- Population: 361
- Time zone: UTC+1 (CET)
  - Summer (DST): UTC+2 (CEST)
- Vehicle registration: GTC

Narkowy [narˈkɔvɨ] is a village in the administrative district of Gmina Subkowy, within Tczew County, Pomeranian Voivodeship, in northern Poland. It is located within the ethnocultural region of Kociewie in the historic region of Pomerania.

Narkowy was a private church village of the monastery in Pelplin, administratively located in the Tczew County in the Pomeranian Voivodeship of the Kingdom of Poland.
