= Mała Słońca =

Village in Pomeranian Voivodeship, Poland

- Village
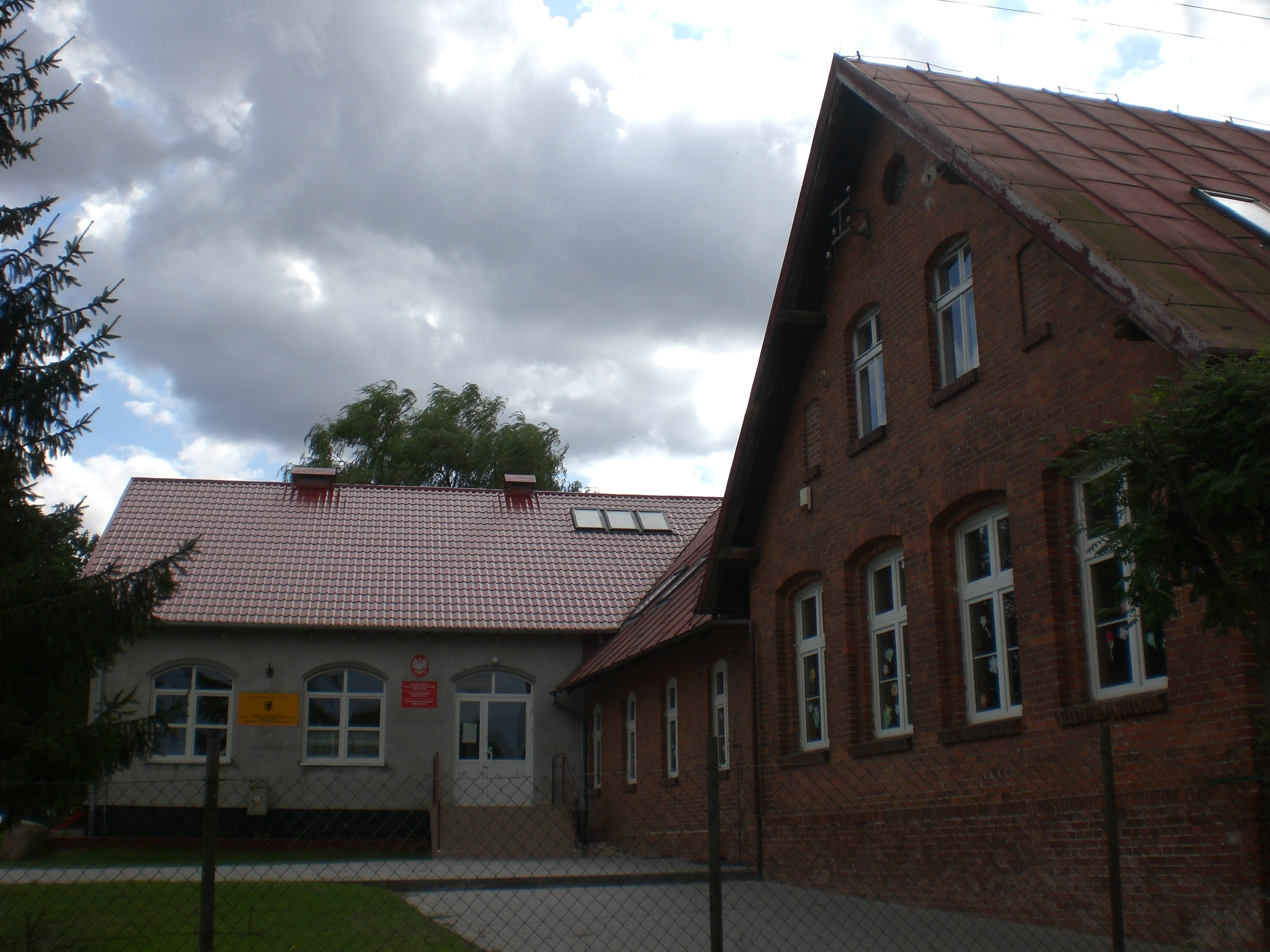
- School in Mała Słońca

- Location within Poland
- Coordinates: 54°0′14″N 18°49′44″E
- Country: Poland
- Voivodeship: Pomeranian
- County: Tczew
- Gmina: Subkowy
- Population: 280
- Time zone: UTC+1 (CET)
  - Summer (DST): UTC+2 (CEST)
- Vehicle registration: GTC

Mała Słońca [ˈmawa ˈswɔɲt͡sa] is a village in the administrative district of Gmina Subkowy, within Tczew County, Pomeranian Voivodeship, in northern Poland. It is located within the ethnocultural region of Kociewie in the historic region of Pomerania.

Mała Słońca was a royal village of the Polish Crown, administratively located in the Tczew County in the Pomeranian Voivodeship.
