= Adela Świątek =

Polish mathematician (1945–2019)

Adela Świątek (2 September 1945 – 27 September 2019) was a Polish mathematician and teacher at the Nicolaus Copernicus University Faculty of Mathematics and Computer Science, and a popularizer of mathematics.

== Biography ==
Adela Świątek was born on 2 September 1945 in Człuchów, Poland. She graduated in mathematics from the Nicolaus Copernicus University in 1968 and since then, she was professionally associated with the University's Institute of Mathematics. In 1975, she defended her doctoral thesis entitled: Category of cube objects, supervised by Professor Stanisław Balcerzyk. In the years 1996–2001 she headed the postgraduate study Mathematics Teachers.

In her professional work, she dealt with issues related to teaching mathematics and the education of students specializing in teaching. She was one of the originators of the Task League competition in the region, and she participated in the organization of the International Mathematical Kangaroo Competition in Poland. She was a co-author of popular science publications thematically related to the Mathematical Kangaroo competition. She was associated with the competition since 1993 and she participated in the work of international bodies setting competition tasks, prepared tasks for Polish environments (translations, etc.). She conducted workshops and lectures for competition winners as part of youth mathematics camps.

An obituary notes: "Ada's knowledge and teaching skills did not result solely from her great natural abilities. She did not theorize and did not limit herself to repeating to students the content found in pedagogical publications. For many years she taught in the so-called university classes at the 4th Secondary School in Toruń, she lived school every day, understood its essence, difficulties and challenges. Many of her students took part in the finals of the Mathematical Olympiad."

In 2009, Dr. Adela Świątek was awarded the Medal of the National Education Commission.

She died on 27 September 2019 in Toruń and was buried there at the Central Municipal Cemetery.

== Selected publications ==
Świątek was the author or co-author of more than 30 popular science publications about mathematics, including:

- Bobiński Zbigniew, Jarek Paweł, Nodzyński Piotr, Świątek Adela, Uscki Mirosław: Mathematics with a cheerful Kangaroo (grades III-V middle school). Toruń: Wydawnictwo Aksjomat, 1995. 89 pp.
- Bobiński Zbigniew, Jarek Paweł, Nodzyński Piotr, Świątek Adela, Uscki Mirosław: Mathematics with a cheerful Kangaroo (grades VII-VIII and I-II of secondary school). Toruń: Wydawnictwo Aksjomat, 1995. 181 pp.
- Bobiński Zbigniew, Burnicka Katarzyna, Jarek Paweł, Nodzyński Piotr, Świątek Adela, Uscki Mirosław: Mathematics with a cheerful Kangaroo, grades III-VI. Toruń: Wydawnictwo Aksjomat, 1995. 111 pp.
- Świątek Adela, Uscki Mirosław: Operative teaching of mathematics on selected examples of developed concepts. – Works of the Mathematical and Methodological Seminar of the Faculty of Mathematics and Computer Science of the Nicolaus Copernicus University, No. 2 1995. pp. 113–123
- Bobiński Zbigniew, Burnicka Katarzyna, Jarek Paweł, Nodzyński Piotr, Świątek Adela, Uscki Mirosław: Mathematics with a cheerful Kangaroo: Maluch level, Benjamin. Toruń: Wydawnictwo Aksjomat, 1997. 127 pp.
- Bobiński Zbigniew, Jarek Paweł, Nodzyński Piotr, Świątek Adela, Uscki Mirosław: Mathematics with a cheerful Kangaroo: Cadet, Junior levels. Toruń: Wydawnictwo Aksjomat, 1997. 207 pp.
- Bobiński Zbigniew, Jarek Paweł, Nodzyński Piotr, Świątek Adela, Uscki Mirosław: Mathematics with a cheerful Kangaroo: Student level. Toruń: Wydawnictwo Aksjomat, 1997. 130 pp.
- Świątek Adela: On cyclic systems of equations / Jaroslav Švrček; translation Adela Świątek. In: Regular and semi-regular polygons; On irrational numbers; On cyclic systems of equations / Zbigniew Bobiński [et al.]. Toruń: Wydawnictwo Aksjomat, 2003. pp. 69–82, ill. (Mathematical Miniatures; 11)
