= Janusz Leon Wiśniewski =

Polish scientist and writer (born 1954)

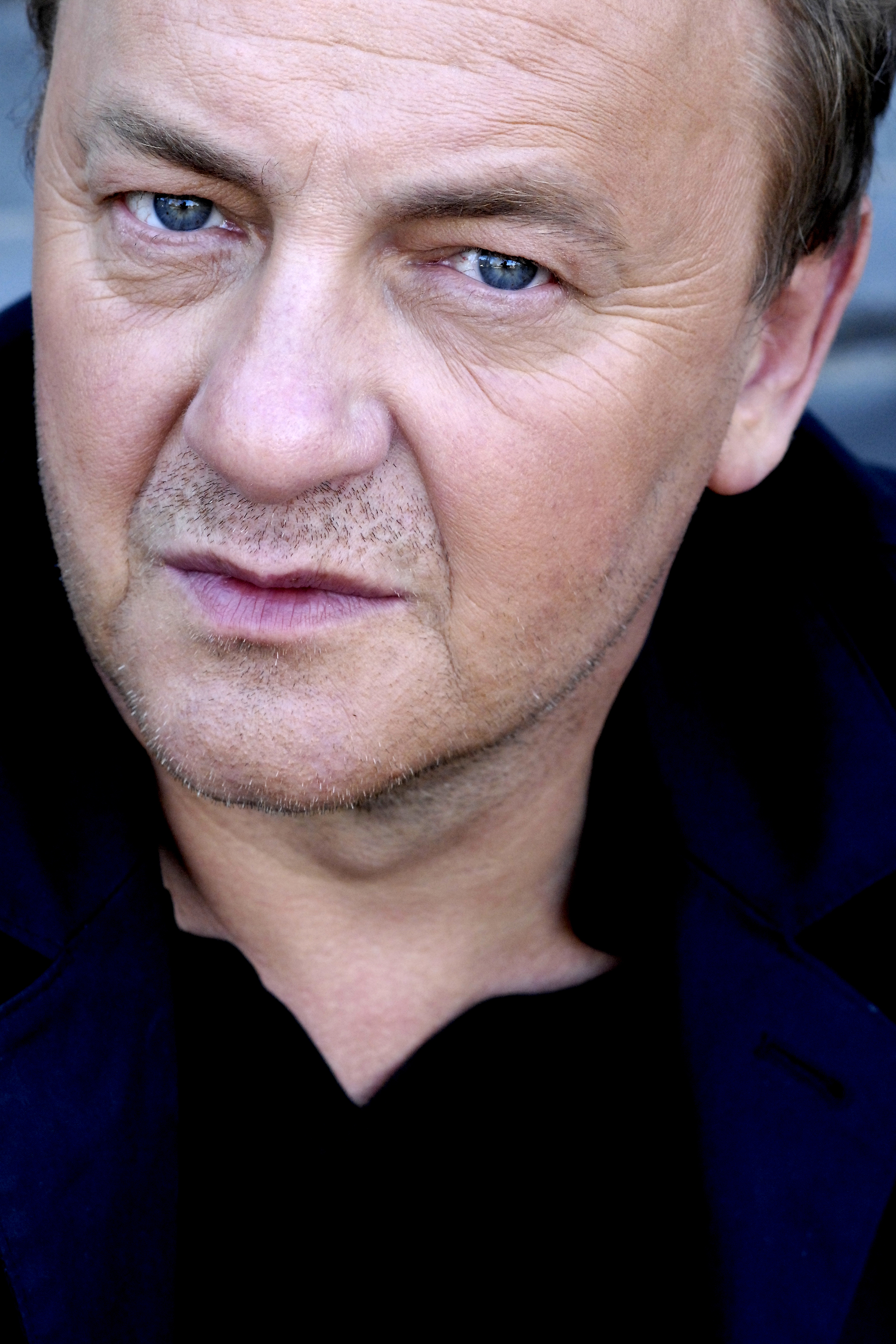
Photo: Agata Dyka (N.Y. 2007)

Janusz Leon Wiśniewski (born 18 August 1954 in Toruń) is a Polish scientist and writer mostly known for his novel S@motność w Sieci translated into English as Loneliness on the Net.

Wiśniewski holds a Master in Physics and Master in Economics, both qualifications obtained from Nicolaus Copernicus University in Toruń, PhD in Information Technology from Warsaw University of Technology and Habilitation in Chemistry from the Technical University of Łódź. He is one of the authors of the computer program AutoNom, a naming tool for organic substances in the IUPAC nomenclature. Currently Wiśniewski lives and works in Frankfurt, Germany. Apart from his native Polish, he is also fluent in German, English and Russian.

His most famous novel S@motność w Sieci (Loneliness on the Net) was published in 2001 and translated into many languages. There is a popular Polish film based on the novel.

== Works ==
- 2014, "'Grand'", (Wydawnictwo Wielka Litera), ISBN 978-83-64142-61-1
- 2012, Na fejsie z moim synem (Wydawinctwo Wielka Litera) ISBN 978-83-63387-01-3
- 2011, Ukrwienia (WL, Wydawnictwo Literackie) ISBN 978-83-08-04655-5
- 2011, Łóżko (Świat Książki, Wydawnictwo ) ISBN 978-83-247-2444-4
- 2011, Zbliżenia (WL, Wydawnictwo Literackie ) ISBN 978-83-08-04456-8
- 2008, Arytmia uczuć (with Dorota Wellman, Wydawnictwo G +J) ISBN 978-83-60376-99-7
- 2008, W poszukiwaniu Najważniejszego. Bajka trochę naukowa ( Nasza Księgarnia, Wydawnictwo Sp. z o.o. ) ISBN 978-83-10-11562-1
- 2007, Czy mężczyźni są światu potrzebni? (Wydawnictwo Literackie) ISBN 978-83-08-04101-7
- 2006, Molekuły emocji (Wydawnictwo Literackie) ISBN 83-08-03902-2
- 2006, Opowiadania letnie, a nawet gorące Wydawnictwo Prószyński i S-ka SA ISBN 83-7469-328-2
- 2005, 188 dni i nocy (with Małgorzata Domagalik, Wydawnictwo Santorski & Co) ISBN 83-60207-20-8
- 2005, Opowieści wigilijne Wydawnictwo Prószyński i S-ka SA ISBN 83-7469-172-7
- 2005, Intymna teoria względności (Wydawnictwo Literackie) ISBN 83-08-03738-0
- 2005, 10 x miłość Świat Książki ISBN 83-7391-784-5
- 2004, Los powtórzony Wydawnictwo Prószyński i S-ka SA ISBN 83-7337-756-5
- 2003, S@motność w sieci. Tryptyk Wydawnictwa Czarne i Prószyński S-ka) ISBN 83-7337-477-9
- 2003, Martyna (jako współautor, Wydawnictwo Platforma Mediowa Point Group) ISBN 83-918772-0-5
- 2002, Zespoły napięć (Wydawnictwo Prószyński i S-ka SA) ISBN 83-7337-887-1
- 2001, S@motność w sieci (Wydawnictwa Czarne i Prószyński S-ka) ISBN 83-7255-925-2
