= National Laboratory of Atomic, Molecular and Optical Physics =

National inter-university research center in Poland

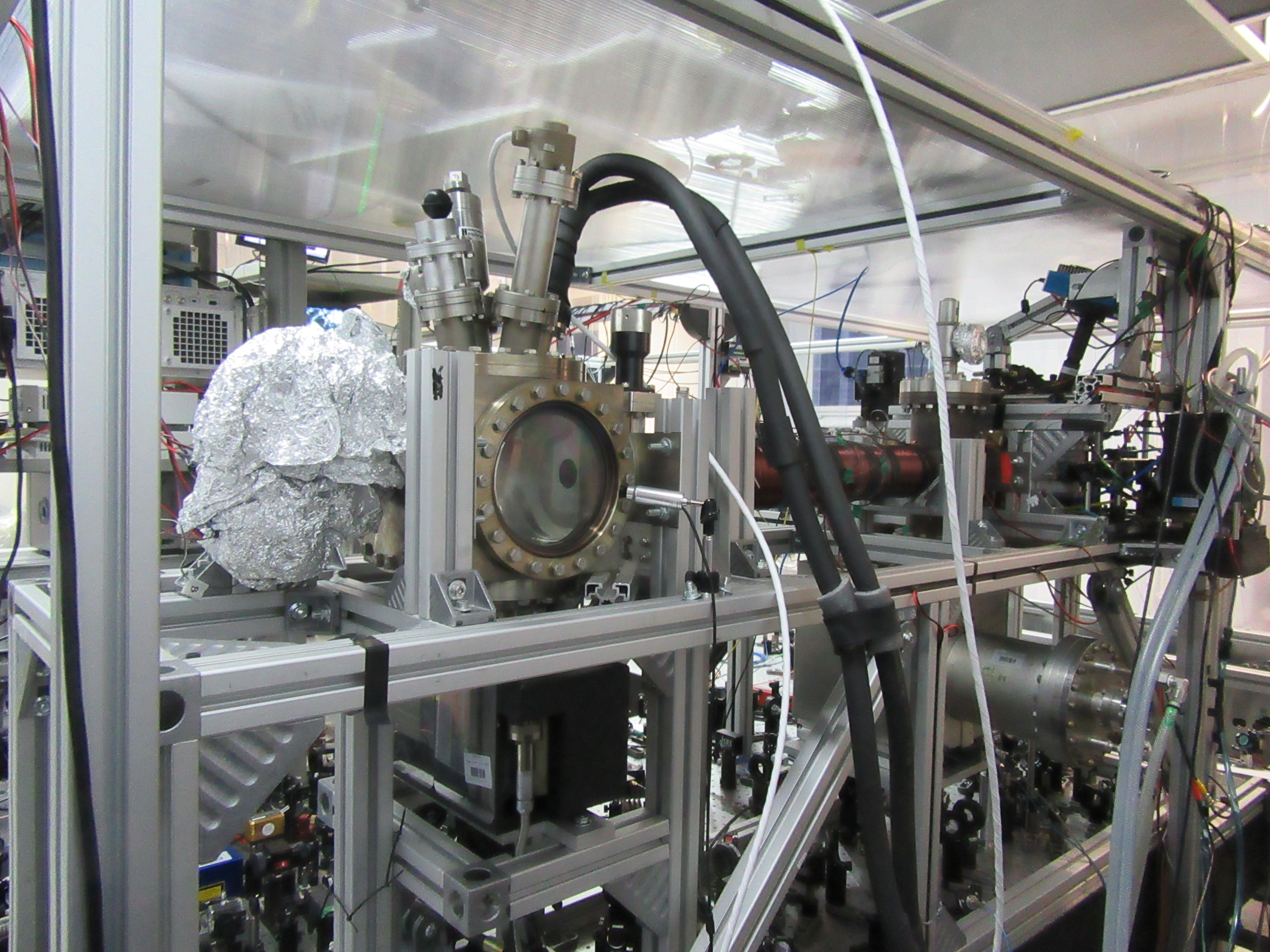
- Ultra-cold rubidium-mercury molecules optical trap in KL FAMO
- Abbreviation: KL FAMO
- Formation: 2002
- Headquarters: Toruń, Polska
- Location(s): ul. Grudziądzka 5/7; PL-87-100 Toruń; Polska
- Coordinates: 53°01′02.0″N 18°36′11.7″E
- Official language: Polish
- Director: Roman Ciuryło

National Laboratory of Atomic, Molecular and Optical Physics (KL FAMO) is the national inter-university research center with the headquarters at Institute of Physics of Nicolaus Copernicus University in Toruń, Poland. Established in 2002, the Laboratory is focused on atomic, molecular, and optical physics (AMO).

== Current research ==
=== Ultra-cold matter ===
The activities of the ultra-cold matter group at KL FAMO are focused on Bose-Einstein condensation (the first BEC in Poland was created in 2007 in KL FAMO), and on ultra-cold molecules' photoassociation spectroscopy.

=== Optical atomic clocks ===
Two strontium optical lattice atomic clocks are operating at the KL FL FAMO. Together with optical frequency combs they form the Polish Optical Atomic Clock (POZA). The POZA is a state-of-the-art optical atomic clock, collaboratively developed by scientists from the University of Warsaw, Jagiellonian University, and Nicolaus Copernicus University.

The optical clocks' experimental group at KL FAMO is conducting research on, i.a., black-body radiation influence on the atomic transitions, shapes of molecules potentials by photoassociation spectroscopy, and on topological defects dark matter .

=== Quantum engineering ===
The studies of the quantum optics group are focused on experimental verifications of fundamental quantum mechanics predictions. In particular, the Laboratory is especially interested in quantum metrology, quantum information and quantum key distribution studies. Modern quantum information experiments are performed using single optical photons as the so-called qubits.

=== High resolution spectroscopy ===
High resolution spectroscopic studies in the Laboratory are based on the Cavity ring-down spectroscopy (CRDS). In CRDS experiments the resonant optical cavity filled with a light-absorbing gas is pumped up by the laser. The absorption spectrum can be determined by measuring the wavelength dependence of time constant of the decay of the light transmitted through one of the optical cavity mirrors. The CRDS is an excellent tool for trace gas detection and precise measurements of weak absorption spectra. The laboratory provides accurate data for spectroscopic databases such as HITRAN.

=== Ion traps ===
The research of the ion group is focused on trapped molecular ions in the ion traps – relatively new branch of physics. Recent works in this field focus on the production, detection and cooling of the molecular ions. The trapped molecules are subject to spectroscopic investigations and as products/substrates for cold chemistry of single molecules.
