= Radostkowo =

Village in Pomeranian Voivodeship, Poland

- Settlement
- Location within Poland
- Coordinates: 53°59′24″N 18°44′04″E
- Country: Poland
- Voivodeship: Pomeranian
- County: Tczew
- Gmina: Subkowy
- Time zone: UTC+1 (CET)
  - Summer (DST): UTC+2 (CEST)
- Vehicle registration: GTC

Radostowo [radɔstˈkɔvɔ] is a settlement in the administrative district of Gmina Subkowy, within Tczew County, Pomeranian Voivodeship, in northern Poland. It is located in the ethnocultural region of Kociewie in the historic region of Pomerania.
