= Waćmierz =

Village in Pomeranian Voivodeship, Poland

- Village
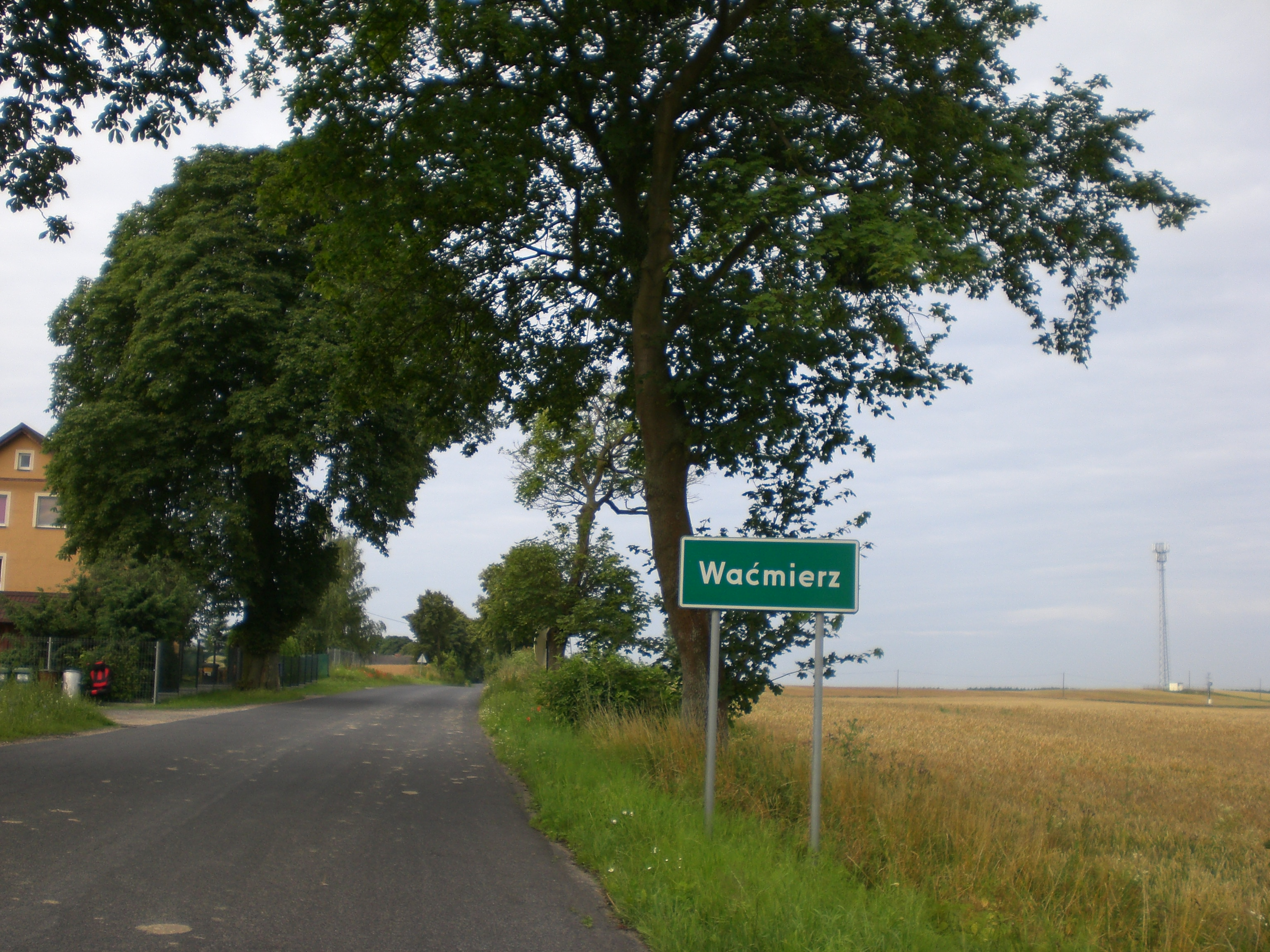

- Location within Poland
- Coordinates: 54°1′9″N 18°41′31″E
- Country: Poland
- Voivodeship: Pomeranian
- County: Tczew
- Gmina: Subkowy

Population
  - Total: 259
- Time zone: UTC+1 (CET)
  - Summer (DST): UTC+2 (CEST)
- Vehicle registration: GTC

Waćmierz [ˈvat͡ɕmjɛʂ] is a village in the administrative district of Gmina Subkowy, within Tczew County, Pomeranian Voivodeship, in northern Poland. It is located within the ethnocultural region of Kociewie in the historic region of Pomerania.
