= Gorzędziej =

Village in Pomeranian Voivodeship, Poland

- Village
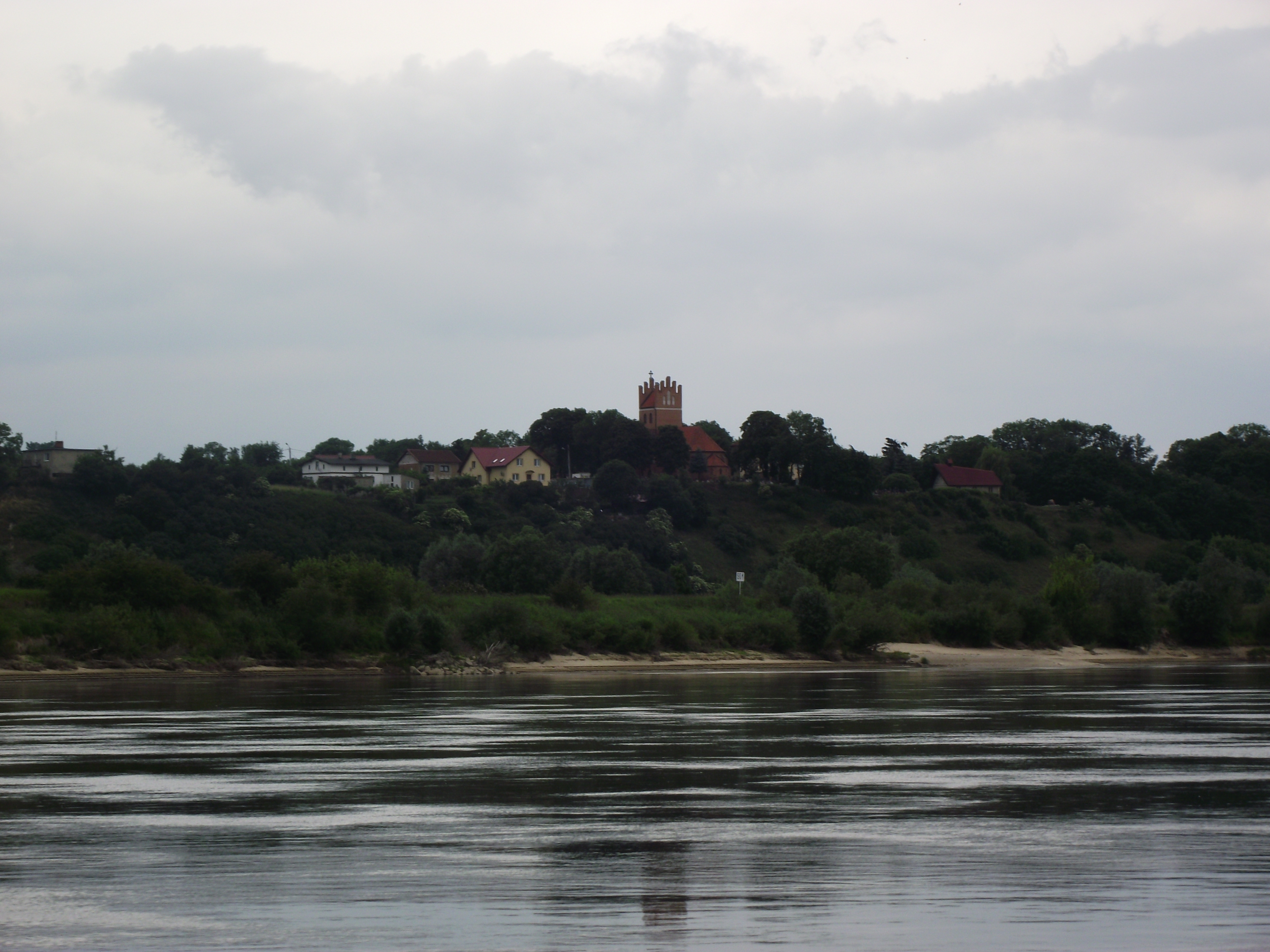
- Panorama of Gorzędziej from the Vistula river

- Location within Poland
- Coordinates: 54°1′57″N 18°49′9″E
- Country: Poland
- Voivodeship: Pomeranian
- County: Tczew
- Gmina: Subkowy
- Town rights: 1287
- Town rights revoked: 1312

Population
  - Total: 542
- Time zone: UTC+1 (CET)
  - Summer (DST): UTC+2 (CEST)
- Vehicle registration: GTC

Gorzędziej [ɡɔˈʐɛnd͡ʑɛi̯] is a village in the administrative district of Gmina Subkowy, within Tczew County, Pomeranian Voivodeship, in northern Poland. It is located in the ethnocultural region of Kociewie in the historic region of Pomerania.

== History ==
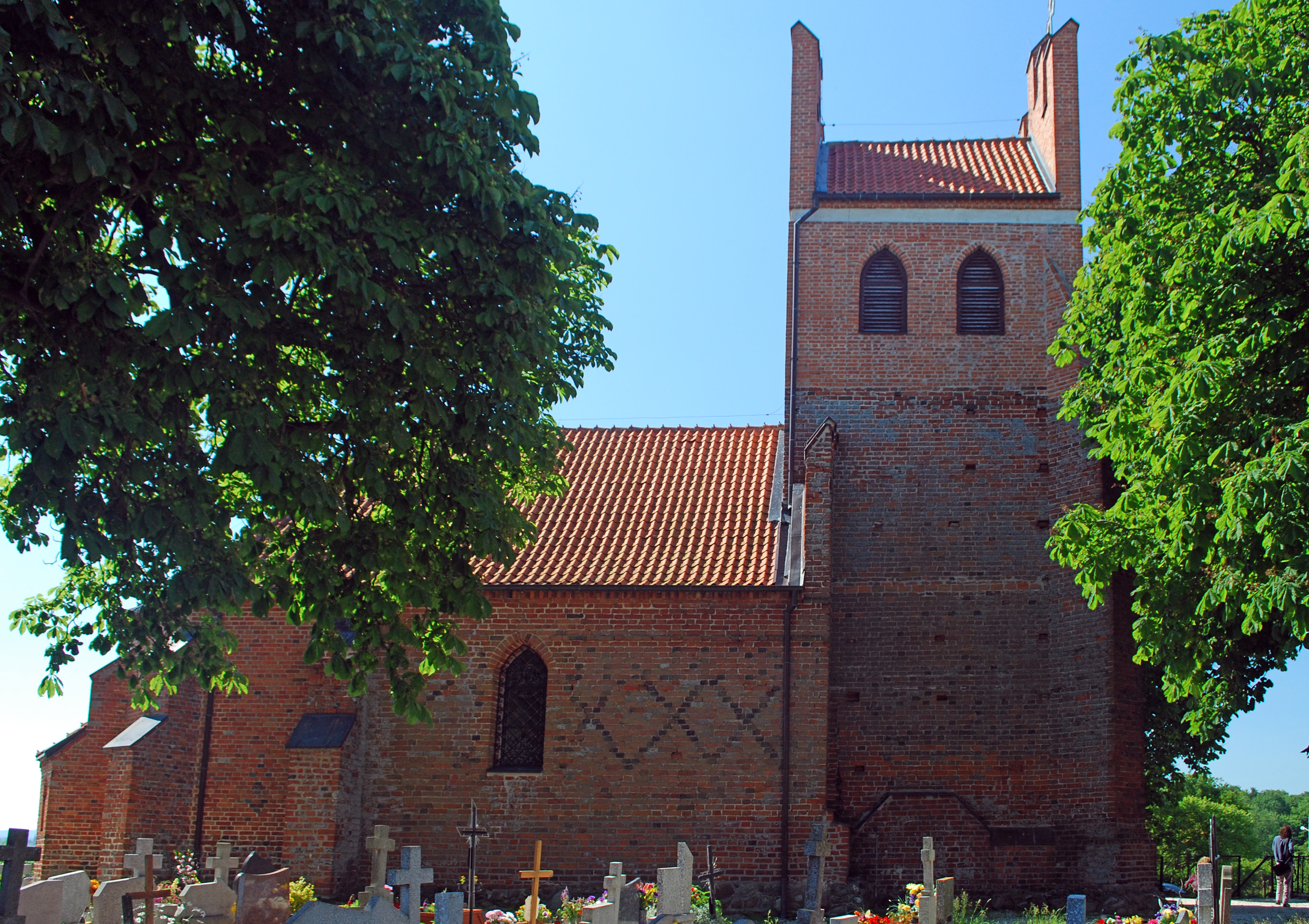
Gothic Saint Adalbert church

A fortification is known to have existed here at least since some time before 1233, since it is known that it was reinforced 1233–1236 by Duke Sambor II with the help of the Teutonic Order. Sometime later it was captured by his brother, Świętopełk II. In 1282 his son Mestwin II gave the castle to the Bishop of Płock. The bishop founded a town that grew up around the castle. It was granted town rights in 1287. In 1312 the town was bought by the Teutonic Order and was deprived of its town rights. It was later a royal village of the Kingdom of Poland, administratively located in the Tczew County in the Pomeranian Voivodeship. The village suffered much damage in the Deluge and was almost completely abandoned. In 1905, the town had 436 inhabitants; in 1943, 435.

During the German occupation of Poland (World War II), Gorzędziej was one of the sites of executions of Poles, carried out by the Germans in 1939 as part of the Intelligenzaktion.
