= Rybaki, Tczew County =

Village in Pomeranian Voivodeship, Poland

Rybaki
- Village
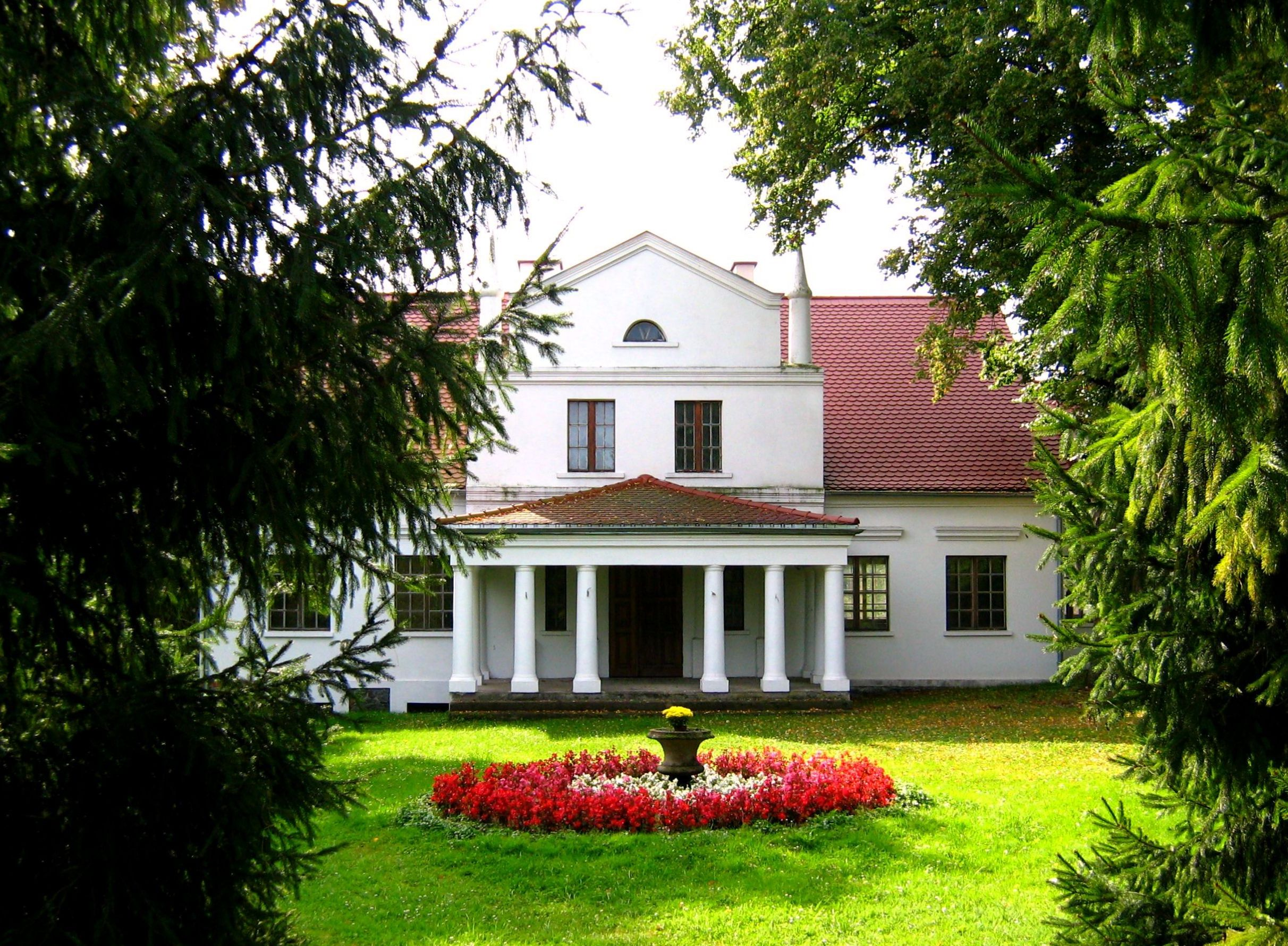
- Historic manor in Rybaki

- Location within Poland
- Coordinates: 53°59′6″N 18°49′51″E
- Country: Poland
- Voivodeship: Pomeranian
- County: Tczew
- Gmina: Subkowy

Population
  - Total: 142
- Time zone: UTC+1 (CET)
  - Summer (DST): UTC+2 (CEST)
- Vehicle registration: GTC

Rybaki [rɨˈbaki] is a village in the administrative district of Gmina Subkowy, within Tczew County, Pomeranian Voivodeship, in northern Poland. It is located in the ethnocultural region of Kociewie in the historic region of Pomerania.
