= Nicolaus Copernicus University Library =

Academic library in Toruń, Poland

The University Library in Toruń
- Biblioteka Uniwersytecka UMK w Toruniu
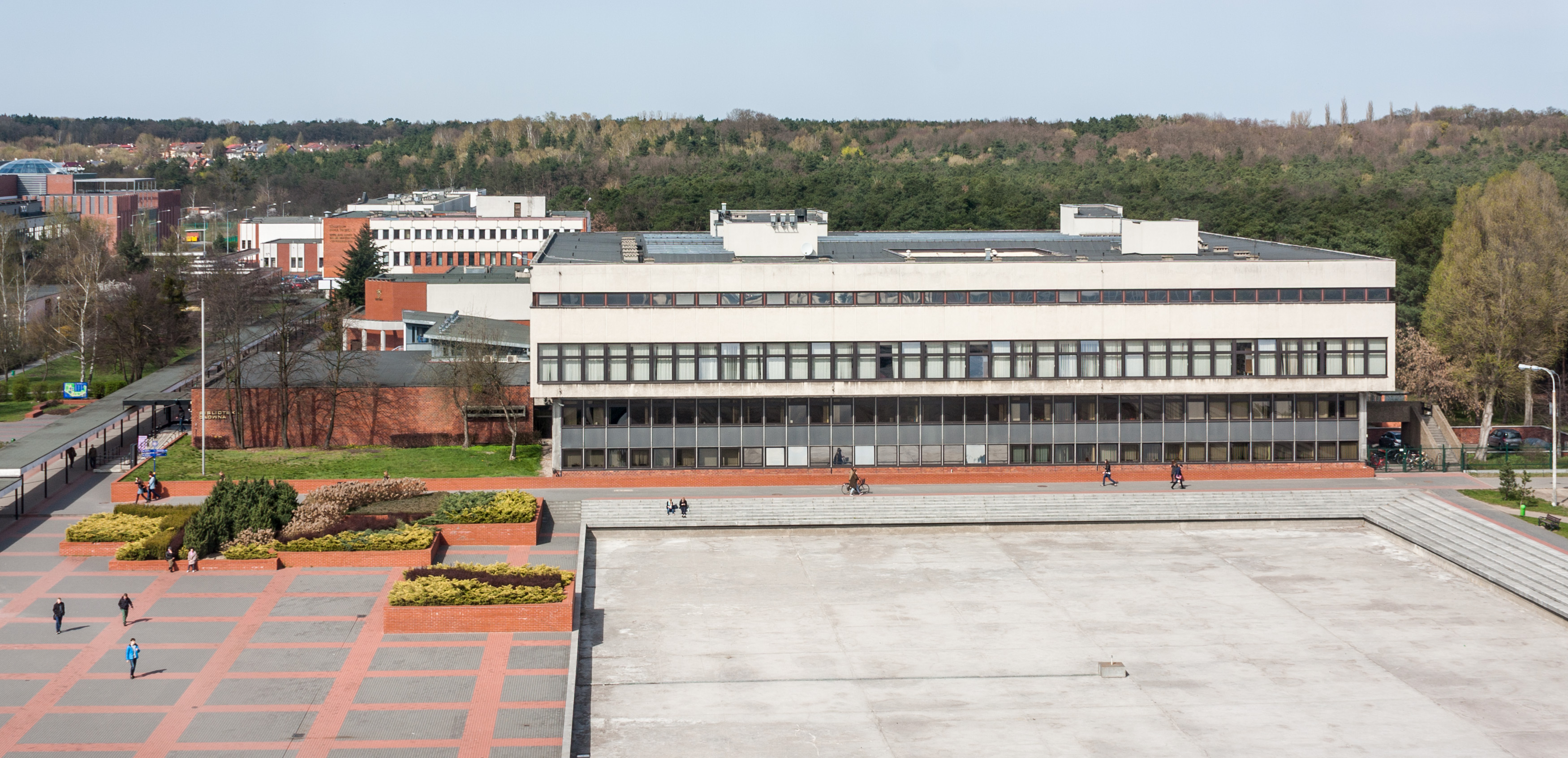
- Building of the Library at NCU Campus
- 53.0202841°N 18.5712064°E
- Location: Toruń, Poland
- Type: Academic library
- Established: 1945

Other information
- Affiliation: Nicolaus Copernicus University
- Website: https://bu.umk.pl

The Nicolaus Copernicus University Library is a unit of Nicolaus Copernicus University in Toruń. It consists of the Main Library, faculty libraries, and the University Museum, together forming a unified library and information network.

The Nicolaus Copernicus University Library was established on August 24, 1945, alongside the Nicolaus Copernicus University, Toruń, Poland.

The Library is the coordinator of Kujawsko-Pomorska Digital Library.

== Main Tasks ==
Collection and cataloging of resources, storage and preservation of collections, providing access to collections, information services, scientific and research activities, educational and outreach activities, institutional cooperation and exchange.

== History ==
Following the founding of Nicolaus Copernicus University, the University Library was officially established on September 1, 1945. It was intended to serve as the university’s primary academic resource and the largest public book collection in Northern Poland.

From the very beginning, the University Library shared a location with the Municipal Library (Książnica Miejska) at 16 Wysoka Street in Toruń. In addition to sharing the same premises, both libraries were managed by the same director — Stefan Burhardt — who held the position simultaneously in both institutions.

By 1947, the Library had moved to its own building at 12 Chopina Street. During Burhardt's continued directorship, the library employed a staff of 32. This period saw the beginning of subject cataloguing based on an internally developed classification system, as well as the formation of the library’s first organizational structure, which was further developed in subsequent years. The library was divided into three departments:

- Collection Development Department;
- Cataloguing and Special Collections Department;
- Reader Services Department.

In 1967, work began on the development of a unified university campus for Nicolaus Copernicus University in the Bielany district. The complex included a new building for the University Library, designed by architect Witold Benedyk. In 1973, the Library relocated to this new building, which remains its headquarters to this day.

Due to the rapidly growing book collection, an additional storage facility was constructed between 1987 and 1992, covering nearly 2,400 square meters and capable of holding approximately 750,000 volumes. The move to the new facility also marked a significant modernization of the Library’s technical infrastructure, particularly in the area of document reproduction. In 1975, the Library acquired advanced copying and microfilming equipment.

By the late 1980s, the Nicolaus Copernicus University Library had gained its first experience with computerization and began developing an electronic catalogue using the ISIS system, based on bibliographic records sourced from the Bibliographic Guide compiled by the National Library since 1985.

The 1990s brought a dynamic phase of digitization. The Library computerized its core processes for cataloguing and access to collections, implementing the American integrated library system HORIZON and migrating bibliographic records from ISIS. Intensive efforts were also made to expand electronic catalogues. During this time, the library network employed over 200 staff members.

In 2021, the Library transitioned to the Alma system with the Primo search interface. This change enabled real-time cooperative cataloguing of the Toruń university library’s holdings within the nationwide library network.

== Building and facilities ==
=== Location ===
The Main Library building is located in the western part of the city, in the Bielany district, at 13 Gagarina Street.

=== Specialized rooms, reading rooms, and group study areas ===
- Main Reading Room

Workspace where users can access and work with open-access collections, on-site materials (books and journals), electronic journals, and databases available through the university network using designated computer stations, a terminal for the Digital Lending Library of Scientific Publications, and materials obtained via Interlibrary Loan. A microform reader and a scanner are also available for users in this area.

- Pomeranian Collection

Established in 1975, this room contains a curated reference collection covering the political, social, and economic history, as well as cultural, scientific, artistic, and religious issues of regions such as historical Pomerania (Western and Farther Pomerania), Warmia and Masuria, Gdańsk Pomerania including Chełmno Land, former East Prussia up to Klaipėda, as well as Lithuania, Latvia, Estonia, and Scandinavian countries. Within the Pomeranian Studies Laboratory, the following bibliographies are compiled: Bibliography of the History of Eastern and Western Pomerania, Bibliography of the City of Toruń, Bibliographie zur Geschichte Pommerns, and Bibliographie zur Geschichte Ost- und Westpreußens.

- Special Collections Reading Room

A dedicated area where items from the library’s special collections are made available, including manuscripts, old prints, graphic, cartographic, and music collections, as well as social life documents. These materials are available for use only within the reading room. Users may order document copies or take photographs using their own equipment.

- Academic Relaxation Zone

A space designed for university community members to work, rest, unwind, study individually or in groups, and engage in discussions. It features a kitchenette, sofas, armchairs, desks for individual or group work, and a television with an HDMI input for connecting personal devices. The area is spread over two levels and offers a total of 80 workspaces.

- Social Digitalization Lab

A lab that allows users to scan their own materials free of charge (e.g. family archives, personal publications, documents, etc.). Materials may be deposited and made available through the Kuyavian-Pomeranian Digital Library (Kujawsko-Pomorska Biblioteka Cyfrowa) after prior verification of the legal conditions for sharing and dissemination.

=== Accessibility for people with disabilities ===
The library is equipped with infrastructure adapted to the needs of individuals with various types of disabilities. Within the library premises, there are ramps, platforms, and elevators for people with mobility impairments. The building also includes restrooms accessible to people with disabilities.

The library is equipped with hardware and software designed to facilitate access to its resources for blind and visually impaired users, including:

- a Braille printer,
- a scanner designed for scanning thick materials such as books,
- Duxbury Braille Translator – an application for converting plain text into Braille,
- Abbyy FineReader Professional 10,
- Computer workstations running Xubuntu 20 Linux. Workstations are equipped with keyboards adapted for visually impaired users, as well as trackballs in addition to traditional mice. These stations include accessibility software such as: the Orca screen reader, KMag (a screen magnification tool), and the Thorium e-book reader.

=== IT and Technical Services ===
The library provides its users with numerous amenities and technical solutions to support their academic work, including:

- a modern library system that enables simultaneous searching of the university library collections, other library catalogs, and online resources,
- computer workstations,
- EDUROAM wireless network access,
- a scanner,
- book lockers and self-service checkout stations,
- i-See HD text magnifiers – available in the reading rooms, these devices enlarge images from 3x to 74x.

== Holdings ==
The library’s first collection was formed from abandoned German book collections and estate libraries that had been nationalized and gradually allocated to the university by government decisions. In its early years, the library’s holdings comprised approximately 600,000 volumes.

=== As of December 2023, the library’s collection includes ===
Type	Main Library	Departmental Libraries	Medical Library of CM UMK	Total
Books (volumes)	1 512 367	484 216	102 326	2 098 909
Journals (volumes)	652 905	104 392	20 718	778 015
Special collections items	566 180	36 214	4 569	606 963
Digitized items in the KPBC	257 000			257 000
In Total				3 740 887

=== Special Collections and Unique Holdings ===
The Special Collections of the Nicolaus Copernicus University Library include(As of December 2023):

- Manuscripts – 15 243
- Old prints – 57 655
- Music prints – 89 398
- Cartographic documents – 24 556
- Social Life Documents – 252 015
- Graphic documents – 87 568
- Audiovisual materials – 24 656
- Microforms – 8 553

=== Electronic Resources ===
The library provides access to a rich collection of electronic resources, with the current list available on the website (czytelnia online).

As of December 2023, the electronic resources include:

- 62 databases
- 613 968 electronic books (e-books)
- 31 518 electronic journal titles

== Organization and Structure ==
=== Unified library and information network structure ===
- Main Library
  - Department of Information
  - Department of NCU Staff Bibliographies and Bibliometrics
  - Department of Serials
  - Department of Acquisitions and Collection
  - Department of Cataloguing
  - Department of Access Services
  - Department of Storage Services
  - Department of Computerisation and Digitisation
  - Department of Conservation and Preservation
  - Department of Pomeranian Studies
  - Department of Special Collections
    - Cabinet of Documents of Social Life
    - Cabinet of Manuscripts
    - Cabinet of Old Prints
    - Cabinet of Graphic Collections
    - Music Collection Cabinet
    - Cabinet of Cartographic Collections
  - Department of Polish Emigration Archives
- University Museum (part of Polish Emigration Archives Department)
- NCU Departmental Libraries
  - Library of the Institute of Astronomy
  - Library of the Faculty of Humanities
  - Library of the Collegium Humanisticum
  - Library of the Institute of Archaeology
  - Library of the Institute of Physics
  - Library of the Faculty of Chemistry
  - Library of the Faculty of Philosophy and Social Sciences
  - Library of the Faculty of Mathematics and Computer Science
  - Library of the Faculty of Economic Sciences and Management
  - Library of the Faculty of Political Science and Security
  - Library of the Faculty of Law and Administration
  - Library of the Faculty of Fine Arts
  - Library of the Faculty of Theology
  - Medical Library of CM UMK

=== List of Directors ===
No.	Directors	Term of Office
1	Dr Stefan Burhardt, PhD	1945-1949
2	Prof. Ludwik Kolankowski, DSc	1949-1955
3	Dr Maria Puciatowa, PhD	1955-1973
4	Dr Edmund Józefowicz, PhD	1973-1973
5	Dr Henryk Łapiński, PhD	1974-1974
6	Stefan Czaja, MSc	1974-1974
7	Prof. Bohdan Ryszewski, DSc	1974-1986
8	Stefan Czaja, MSc	1986-2003
9	Anna Bogłowska, MSc	2003-2003
10	Dr Mirosław Supruniuk, PhD	2004-2010
11	Dr Krzysztof Nierzwicki, PhD	2010-2024
12	Dr Milena Śliwińska, PhD	currently in office (since 2025)

== Significance and Role in the Region / Academia ==
=== Awards and recognitions ===
In 2002, the NCU Library was honoured with the medal of "Bibliotheca Magna Perennisque" for its "contribution to Polish librarianship".

In December 2002, the NCU Library webpage won third place in a competition for the best Polish library websites, in a research libraries category, organised under the auspices of the Polish Librarians Association.

==== Ranking of the State Committee for Scientific Research (KBN) ====
Based on the results of the evaluation of scientific achievements, the State Committee for Scientific Research granted the NCU Library category 3, which places it in the company of other university libraries in Kraków, Poznań and Warsaw.

=== Library Consortia Membership ===
The University Library is a member of:

- the Consortium of Academic Libraries of the Kuyavian-Pomeranian Region
- the Consortium of Polish Digital Libraries

== See also ==
- Nicolaus Copernicus University in Toruń
- The Nicolaus Copernicus University Press
- List of libraries in Poland
- Open access in Poland
