= Gmina Subkowy =

Gmina Subkowy Subkowy Commune
- Gmina
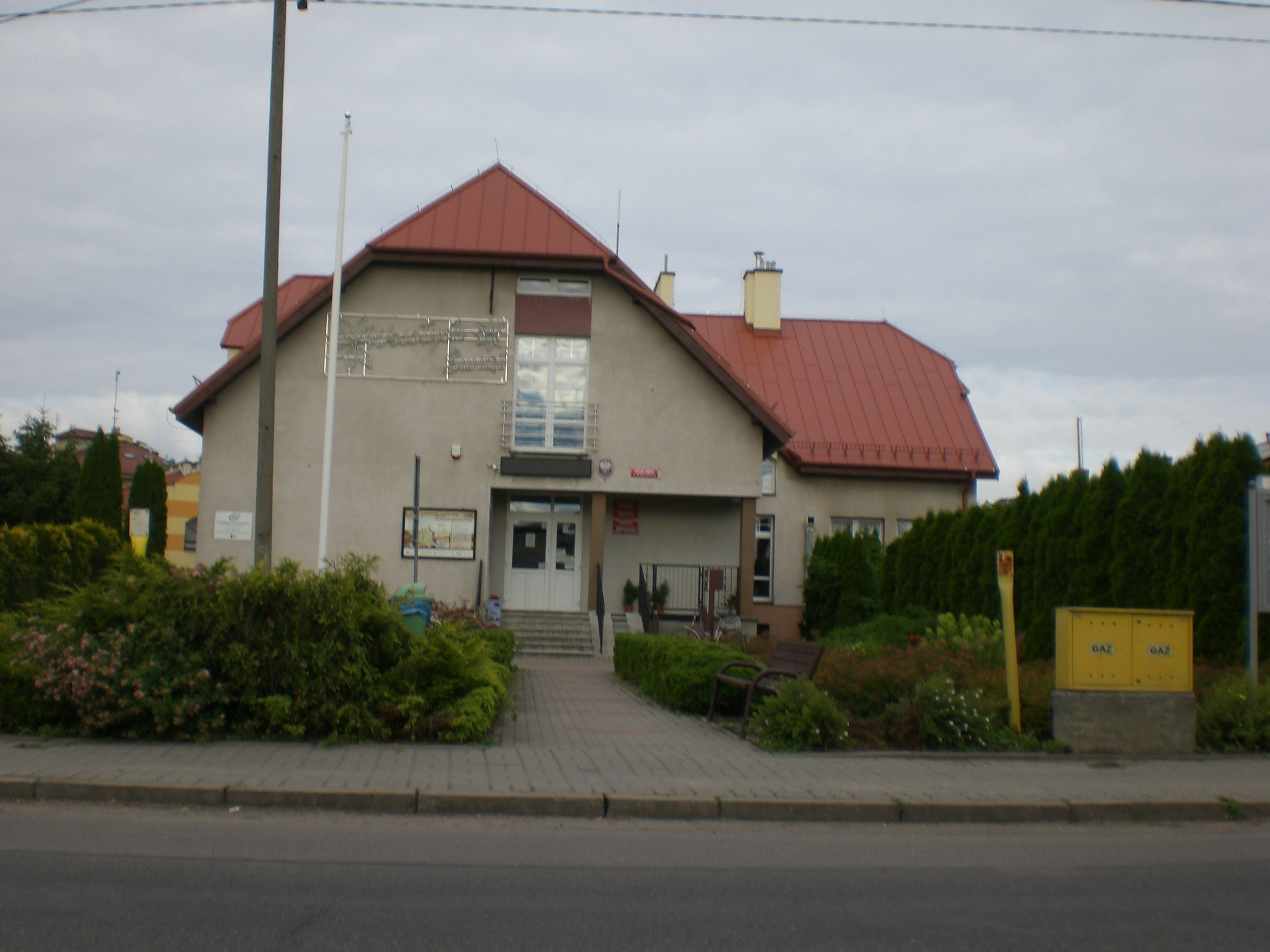
- The Gmina's office in Subkowy

- Coat of arms

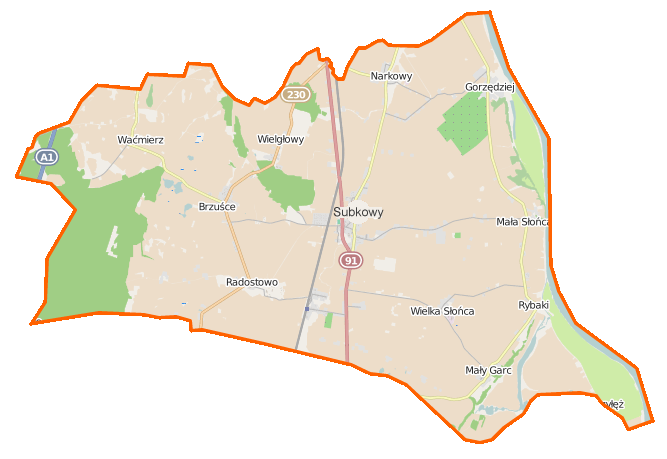

- Location within Pomeranian Voivodeship Location within Poland
- Coordinates (Subkowy): 54°0′6″N 18°46′10″E
- Country: Poland
- Voivodeship: Pomeranian
- County: Tczew
- Seat: Subkowy

Area
  - Total: 78.22 km^{2} (30.20 sq mi)

Population (2022)
  - Total: 5,371
  - Density: 68.67/km^{2} (177.8/sq mi)
- Website: http://www.subkowy.pl

Gmina Subkowy is a rural gmina (administrative district) in Tczew County, Pomeranian Voivodeship, in northern Poland. Its seat is the village of Subkowy, which lies approximately 12 kilometres (7 mi) south of Tczew and 42 km (26 mi) south of the regional capital Gdańsk.

The gmina covers an area of 78.22 square kilometres (30.2 sq mi). In 2022 its population was 5,371.

== Villages ==
Gmina Subkowy contains the villages and settlements of Brzuśce, Bukowiec, Gorzędziej, Mała Słońca, Mały Garc, Mały Gorzędziej, Narkowy, Pasiska, Radostkowo, Radostowo, Rybaki, Starzęcin, Subkowskie Pole, Subkowy, Subkowy Małe, Waćmierz, Wielgłowy and Wielka Słońca.

== Neighbouring gminas ==
Gmina Subkowy is bordered by the gminas of Miłoradz, Pelplin, Starogard Gdański and Tczew.
