= Nicolaus Copernicus University in Toruń =

University in Poland

Coordinates: 53°01′06″N 18°34′20″E

- Uniwersytet Mikołaja Kopernika w Toruniu
- Latin: Universitas Nicolai Copernici
- Type: Public
- Established: 24 August 1945
- Academic affiliations: EUA, Socrates-Erasmus, Young European Research Universities Network
- Rector: Andrzej Tretyn
- Students: 17,849 (12.2023)
- Location: Gagarina 11, 87-100, Toruń, Poland
- Sporting affiliations: AZS UMK; Angels Toruń (football)
- Website: www.umk.pl/en

University rankings

Regional – Overall
- QS Emerging Europe and Central Asia: 83 (2022)

University rankings

Global – Overall
- ARWU World: 901-1000 (2025)
- THE World: 1001-1200 (2024)

Nicolaus Copernicus University in Toruń (Polish: Uniwersytet Mikołaja Kopernika w Toruniu, UMK; Latin: Universitas Nicolai Copernici), founded in 1945, is a public research university in Toruń, Poland. It is named after Nicolaus Copernicus, the Renaissance astronomer and mathematician who was born in Toruń in 1473 and whose formulation of the heliocentric model of the solar system is regarded as a landmark in the development of modern science. Its operation refers both to the life’s work and attitude of its patron, and to the academic heritage of the former Stefan Batory University in Vilnius and John Casimir University in Lviv.

The university consists of over 17 faculties, including biology and veterinary sciences, chemistry, earth sciences, physics, astronomy and informatics, mathematics and computer science, law and administration, economic sciences and management, political science and international studies, philosophy and social sciences, history, languages and applied linguistics, Polish philology, fine arts, education sciences, and theology, as well as the Ludwik Rydygier Collegium Medicum in Bydgoszcz, which includes the faculties of medicine, pharmacy, and health sciences.

UMK has been designated a Leading Research University under Poland’s Excellence Initiative and was the first Polish institution to receive the HR Excellence in Research distinction from the European Commission.

Research in astronomy and astrophysics is a distinctive area of activity. The Piwnice Astronomical Observatory, located near Toruń, operates a 32-metre radio telescope—one of the largest in Central Europe—which is used in international collaborations in radio astronomy, astrophysics, and space science. In medicine, the Collegium Medicum has in recent years established itself among the top three medical schools in Poland, as reflected in national examination outcomes and academic awards.

Institutionally, UMK is a member of the Young European Research Universities Network (YERUN), which also includes universities such as the University of Ulm, Paris Dauphine University, Sorbonne Nouvelle University, Maastricht University, and the University of Antwerp.

In national evaluations, UMK is regularly ranked among the top universities in Poland. In the Unirank 2025 listing it placed 6th nationally. In the Shanghai Ranking 2025 it was positioned 5th nationally among Polish universities.

Among the university’s notable alumni are the poet and essayist Zbigniew Herbert, who from the 1960s was nominated several times for the Nobel Prize in Literature and whose works have been translated into 38 languages; humanitarian activist and MEP Janina Ochojska, founder of the Polish Humanitarian Action; astronomer Aleksander Wolszczan, discoverer of the first confirmed exoplanets; jurist Piotr Hofmański, former President of the International Criminal Court; musician Grzegorz Ciechowski, a leading figure in Polish rock music who won ten Fryderyk Awards, more than any other musician; and politician Sławomir Mentzen, entrepreneur, chairman of the Confederation party, candidate in the 2025 Polish presidential election, and initiator of the eight-point Toruń Declaration - a political manifesto presented to the presidential runoff candidates.

The university’s academic and cultural life is embedded within Toruń’s UNESCO World Heritage–listed historic cityscape, giving it a distinctive European identity.

== History ==
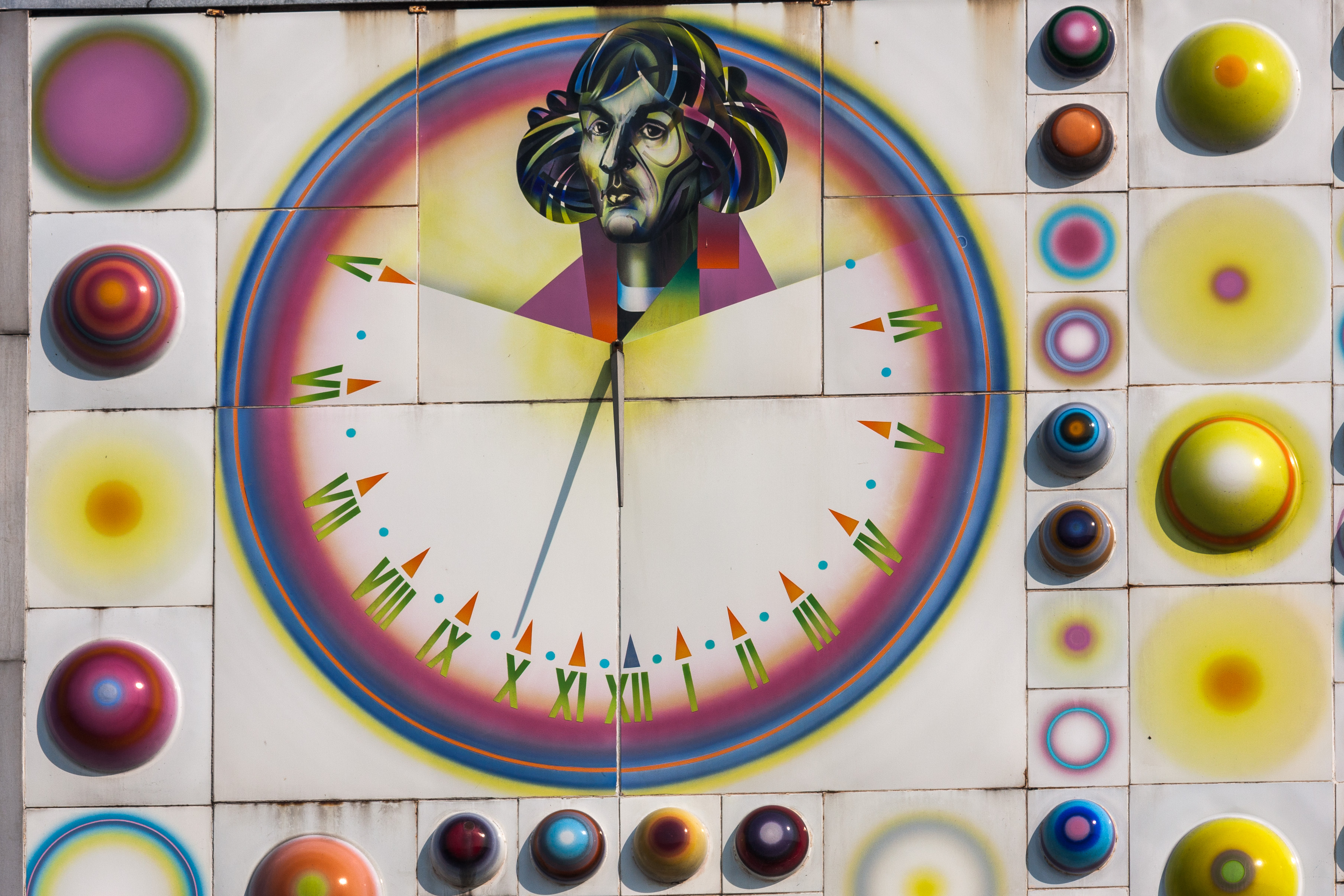
Mosaic by Stefan Knapp depicting Copernicus, NCU Aula

=== The beginnings of higher education in Toruń ===
The first institution of higher education in Toruń, the Toruń Academic Gymnasium was founded in 1568. It was one of the first universities in northern Poland. The Academic Gymnasium was the precursor to scientific and cultural life (including the first museum, created in 1594) in the region. Thanks to the efforts of Heinrich Stroband, city mayor in 1594, academics in Toruń received good working conditions for teaching and research. Among his professors in the seventeenth and eighteenth centuries were meritorious scholars of Polish and Prussian history, authors of textbooks and papers from various disciplines of humanities, and associates scientific journals.

The establishment of the university in a modern form began in the nineteenth century. During the partitions of Poland, the Prussian government planned to create a University of Theology, which was to include faculties of law and economics, but this project did not materialise.

In the interwar period the city authorities of Toruń again sought to establish a university. Soon after the annexation of Pomerania to the reborn Poland in 1920, a new phase of efforts to develop the university began. Even before 1920, the Supreme People's Council had considered the proposal to establish higher educational institutions in the Polish territories annexed by Prussia at the University of Gdansk and in Toruń. However, political developments and the uncertain future of Pomerania prompted the council's leadership to accept the December 1918 resolution of the Sejm to overlook Toruń as a location for a new university and instead go ahead with the development of a university in Poznań.

In 1920, the first declaration requesting the establishment of a university was put forward in November by the National Workers Party whose members chose Toruń-born Nicolaus Copernicus to be the patron of the university. For this purpose a number of educational societies, such as the Baltic Institute (later transferred to Gdynia, and then to Gdańsk) amongst others, were established in the town.

Finally, in 1938, it was decided to set up the Nicolaus Copernicus University in Toruń as a subsidiary of Poznań's Adam Mickiewicz University; work was to start at the beginning of 1940. This program, however, was interrupted by World War II. It was not until 1947, two years after the creation of the Nicolaus Copernicus University. that Prof. Karol Górski revealed that there had been an approved plan to open Poznań University long-distance division in Toruń in 1940, which was supposed to teach the humanities and theology. In the first years after the war, many of the teaching staff consisted of professors, assistants and administrative workers from the Stefan Batory University in Vilnius.

== Faculties ==
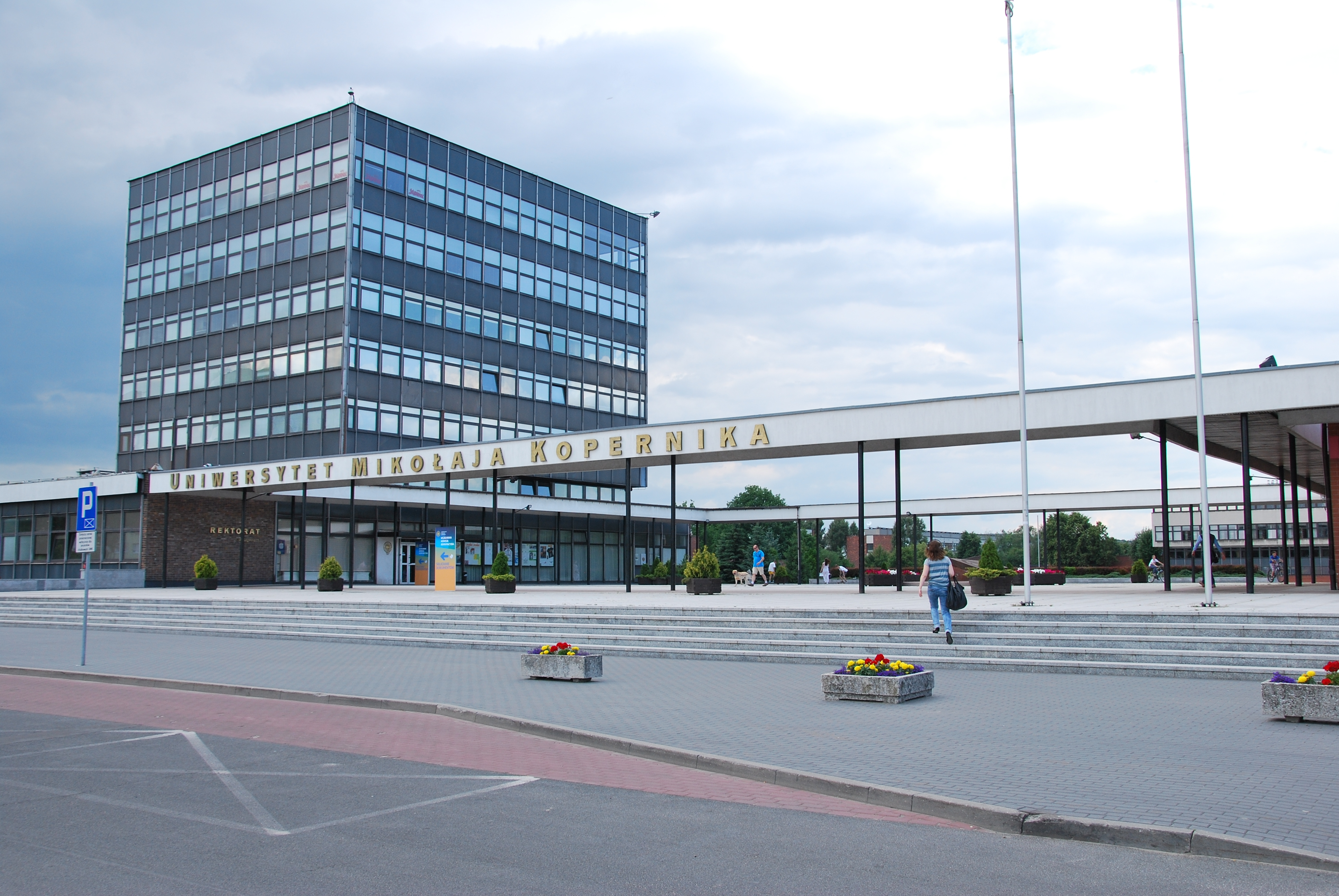
The Rektorat administrative building at Nicolaus Copernicus University in Toruń

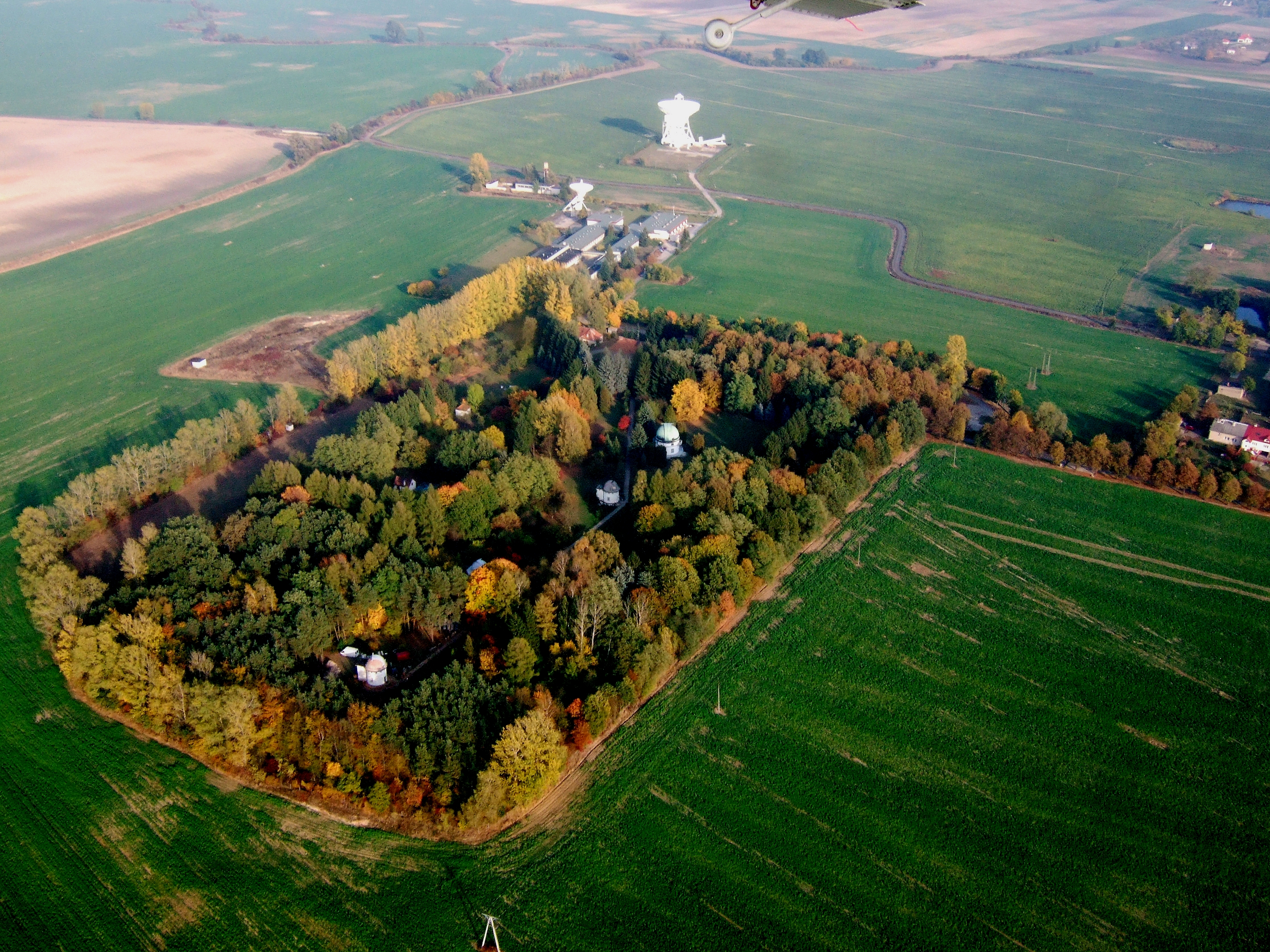
Astronomical observatory in Piwnice

- Faculty of Biological and Veterinary Sciences
- Faculty of Chemistry
- Faculty of Earth Sciences and Spatial Management
- Faculty of Economic Sciences and Management
- Faculty of Fine Arts
- Faculty of Health Sciences
- Faculty of History
- Faculty of Humanities (Former Faculty of Languages)
- Faculty of Law and Administration
- Faculty of Mathematics and Computer Science
- Faculty of Medicine
- Faculty of Pharmacy
- Faculty of Philosophy and Social Sciences (Former Faculty of Humanities)
- Faculty of Political Science and Security Studies
- Faculty of Physics, Astronomy and Informatics
- Faculty of Theology

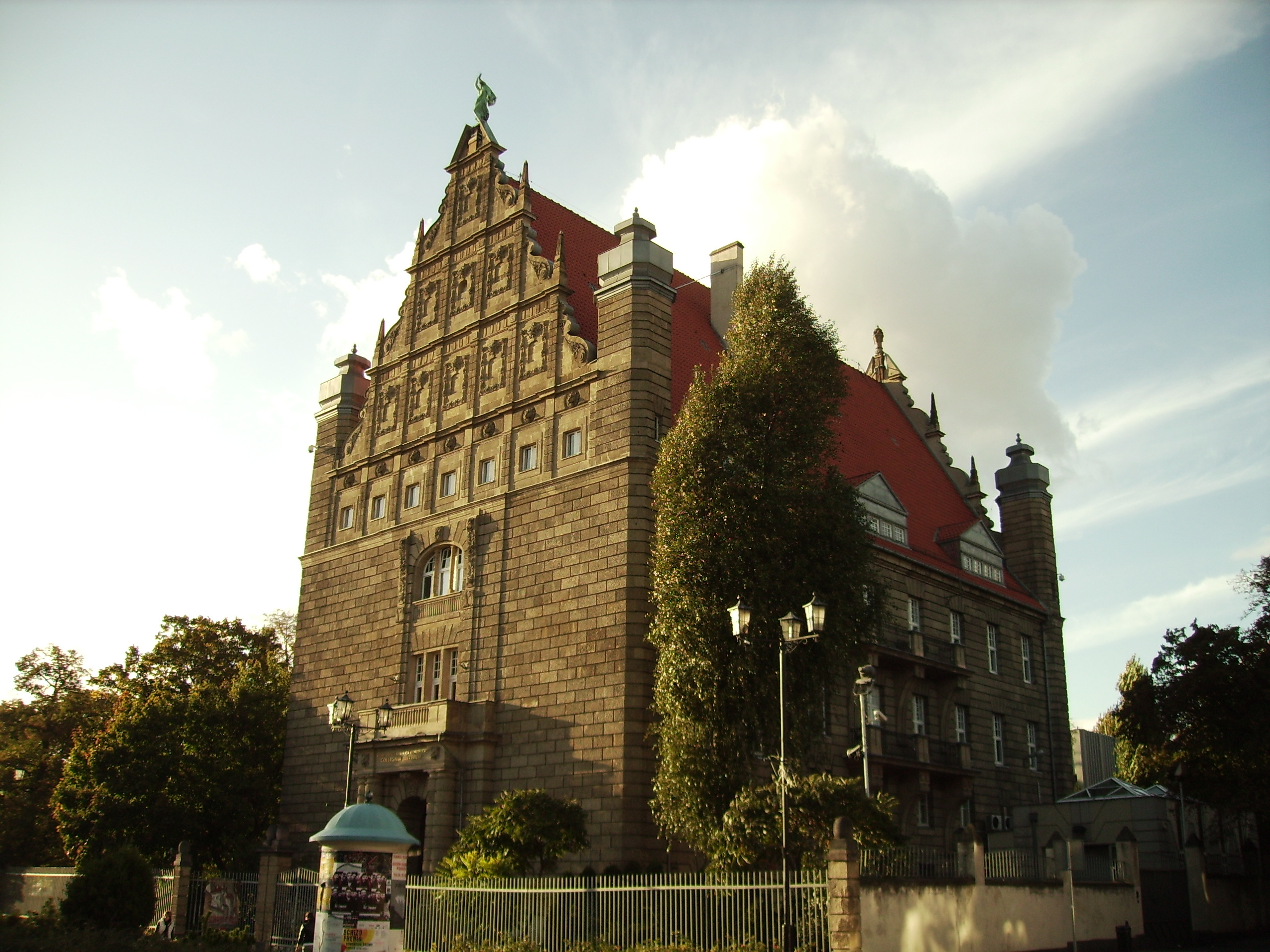
The Collegium Maximus houses the university's museum collections

== Staff ==
Staff / Year	2003	2004	2006	2008	2009	2010
Professors	373	475	485	497	474	485
Habilitated doctors	85	111	107	131	121	123
Senior lecturers	576	805	852	964	995	1,027
Teachers (total)	1,427	2,009	2,077	2,244	2,203	2,221
Other staff	1,663	2,102	2,059	2,180	2,149	2,119
Total staff	3,090	4,111	4,136	4,424	4,352	4,340

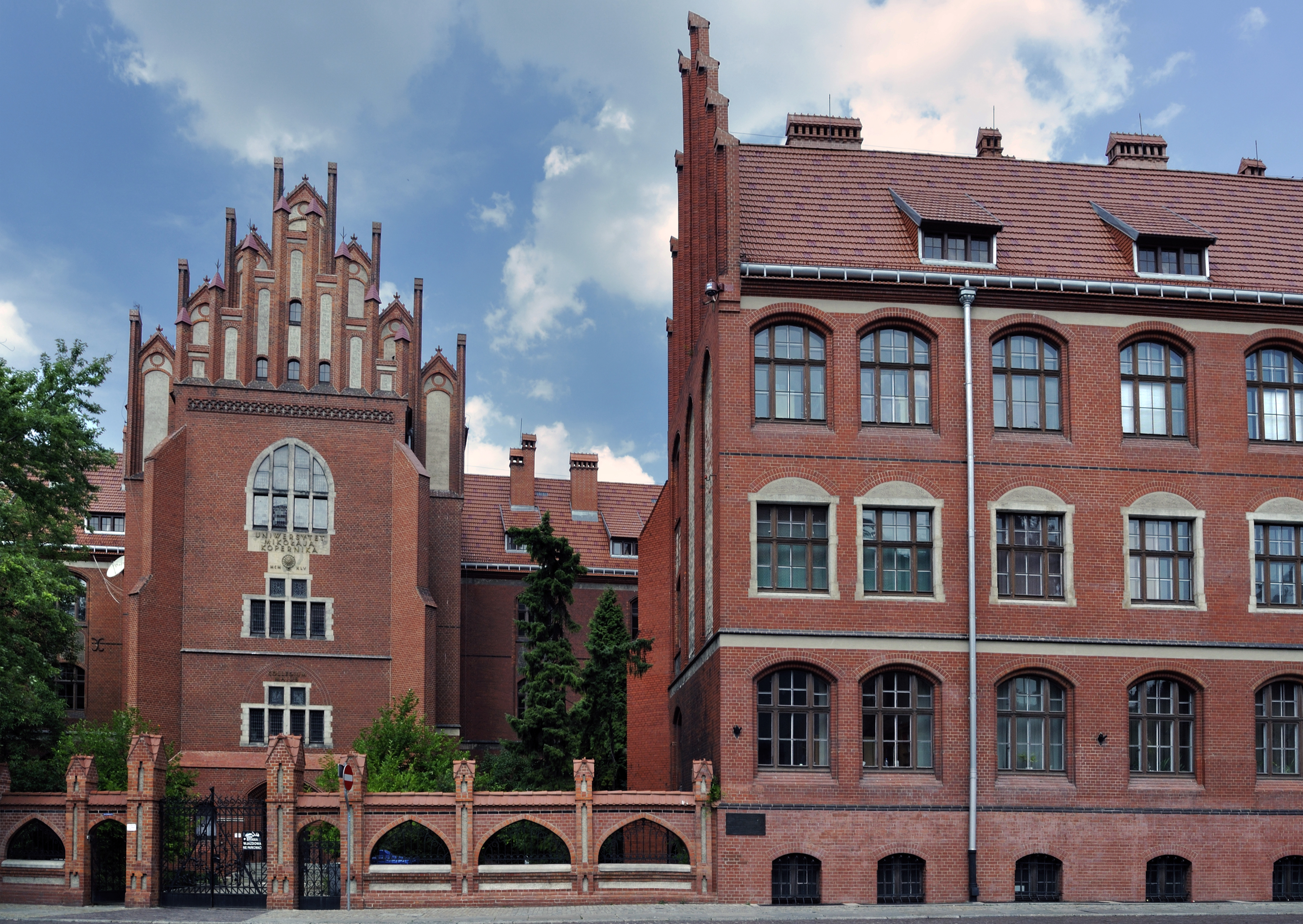
The Nicholas Copernicus University's Collegium Maius

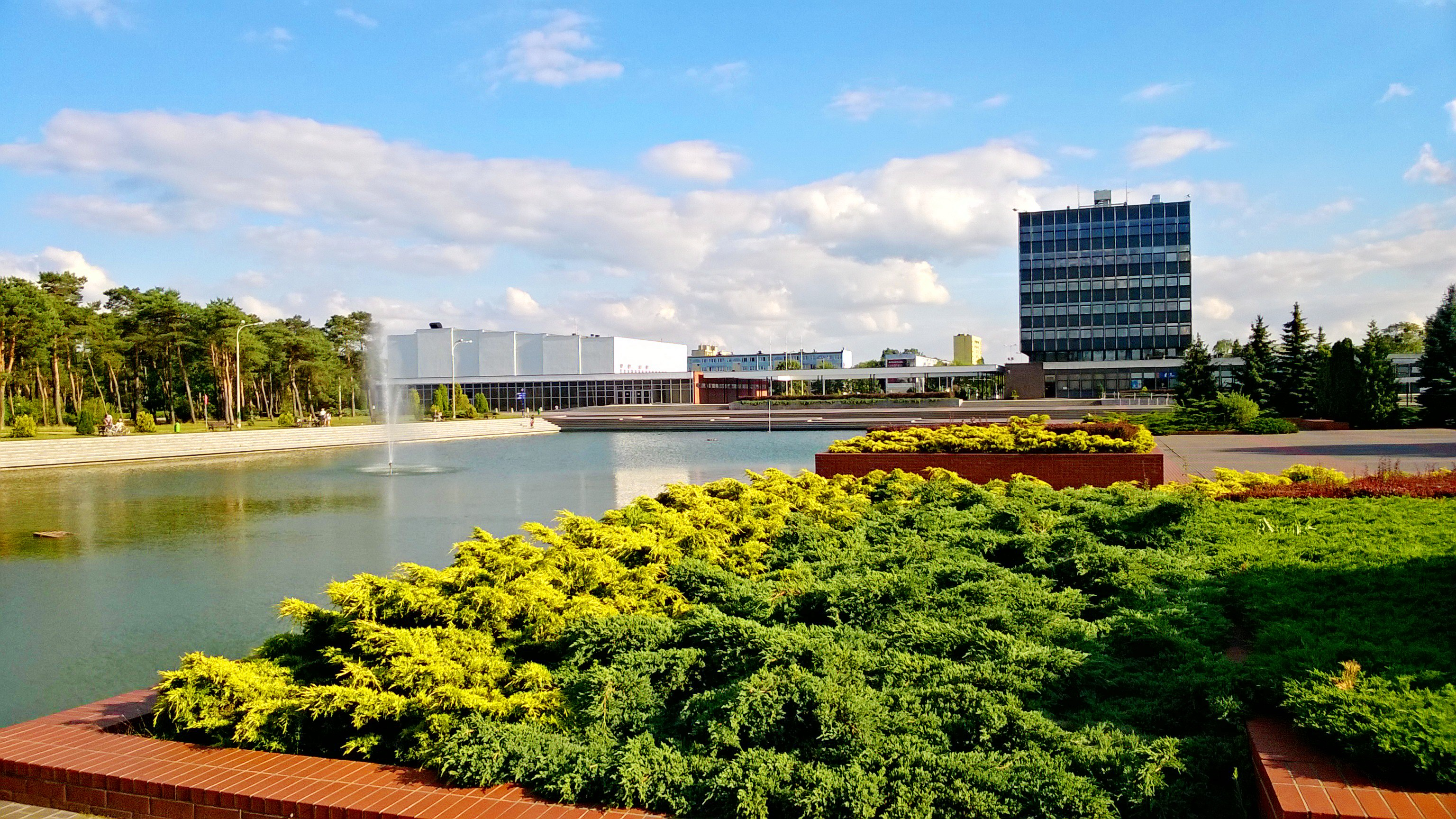
The main campus has an artificial pool (pictured in front of the Aula, the main entrance and the Rektorat) as an architectural focal point.

== Number of students ==
Students / Year	2003	2004	2006	2008	2009	2010
Full-time day students	17,455	20,622	20,688	20,575	21,575	22,725
Extramural students	14,501	16,680	17,178	10,641	9,247	8,110
Postgraduate students	3,889	4,526	2,673	2,487	2,517	2,275
Total	35,845	41,828	40,539	33,703	33,339	33,110

== Levels of study offered by institution ==
- Shorter/intermediate university level qualifications
- First main university level final qualifications
- Advanced/postgraduate study
- Doctorate
- Higher/post doctorate

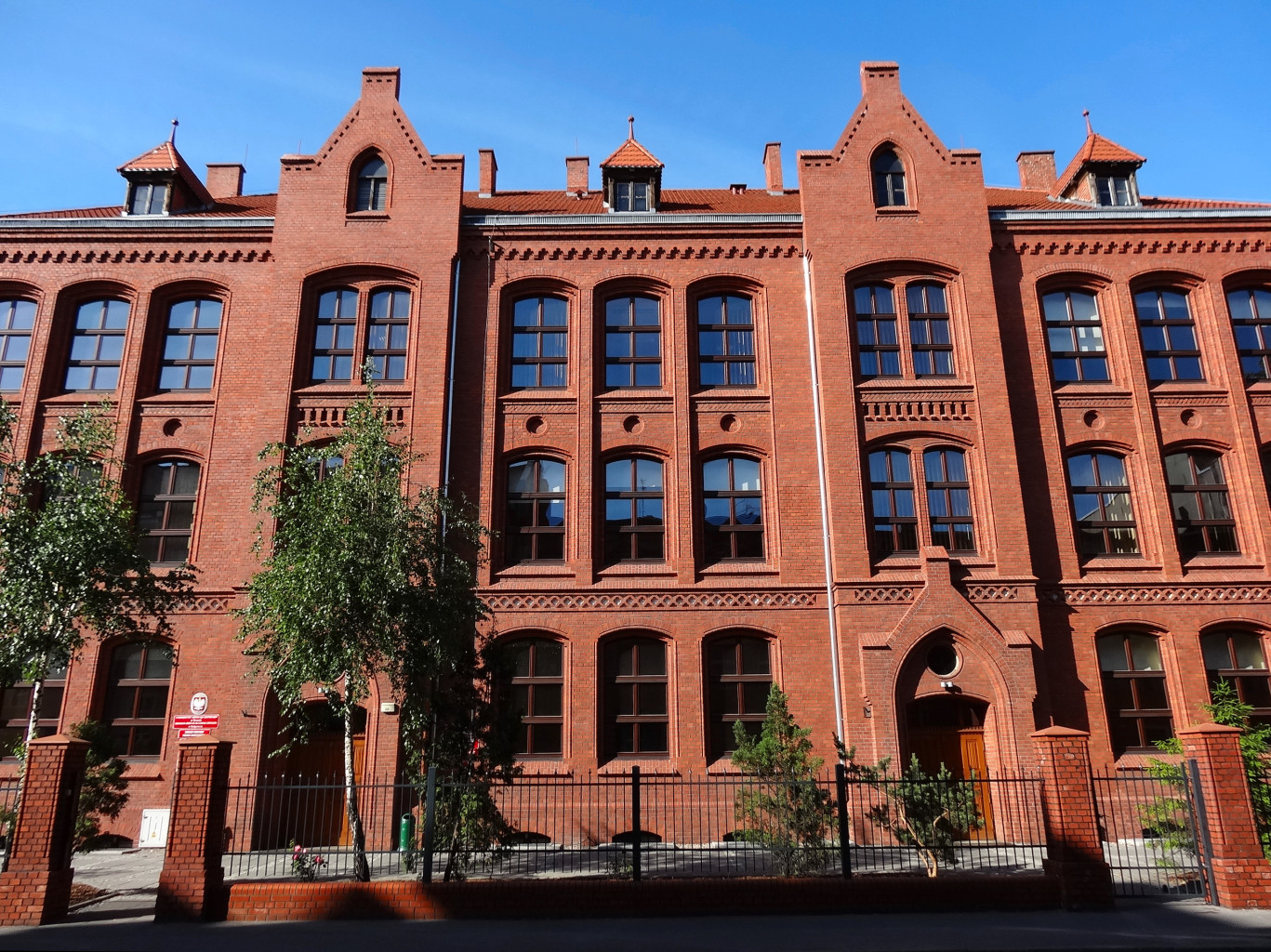
A part of the university's Collegium Medicum which is based in neighbouring Bydgoszcz.

== Diplomas and degrees ==
- Licentiate (3 years undergraduate degree. Equivalent to Bachelor of Science or Bachelor of Arts)
- Engineer (3 or 3.5 years technical degree. Equivalent to Bachelor of Engineering)
- Magister (5 years degree equivalent to a course-based Masters programme)
- Ph.D. Degree
- Habilitated Doctor Degree.

== Rankings ==
University rankings

Global – Overall
- ARWU World: 901-1000 (2025)
- CWUR World: 1023 (2026)
- CWTS World: 715 (2025)
- QS World: 1001-1200 (2027)
- THE World: 1201–1500 (2026)
- USNWR Global: =1112 (2026-27)

In 2018, Times Higher Education ranked the university within the 801-1000 band globally.

== International cooperation ==
- University of Padua – Italy
- University of Ferrara – Italy
- Sapienza University of Rome – Italy
- University of Oldenburg – Germany
- University of Göttingen – Germany
- University of Bamberg, – Germany
- Universität Rostock – Germany
- University of Greifswald – Germany
- University of the Bundeswehr Munich – Germany
- Université d’Angers – France
- Nottingham Trent University – United Kingdom
- Dominican University – USA
- Cranfield University – United Kingdom

== Notable alumni ==
- Piotr Bojańczyk, (born 1946), former national champion, ice dancing
- Iwona Chmielewska (born 1960), author and illustrator
- Zbigniew Herbert, (1924–1998), poet
- Piotr Hofmański, (born 1956), jurist and judge, President of the International Criminal Court (ICC)
- Elżbieta Jabłońska (born 1970), multidisciplinary visual artist
- Maciej Konacki, (born 1972), astronomer
- Mariusz Lemańczyk, (born 1958), mathematician
- Sławomir Mentzen, (born 1986), polish presidential candidate, party leader
- Janina Ochojska, (born 1955), astronomer, humanitarian and social activist
- Andrzej Person, (born 1951), senator and sports journalist
- Jan Rompsczi, (1913–1969), poet and ethnographer
- Adela Świątek, (1945–2019), mathematician and later math faculty
- Janusz Leon Wiśniewski, (born 1954), scientist and writer
- Aleksander Wolszczan, (born 1946), astronomer, discoverer of the first extra-solar planet
- Jacek Yerka, (born 1952), painter
- Rafał Blechacz, (born 1985), classical pianist, winner of the XV International Chopin Piano Competition

== See also ==
- The Nicolaus Copernicus University Library
- The Nicolaus Copernicus University Press
- Nicolaus Copernicus University Polar Station
- Kujawsko-Pomorska Digital Library
- National Laboratory of Atomic, Molecular and Optical Physics
