= Subkowy =

Village in Pomeranian Voivodeship, Poland

- Village
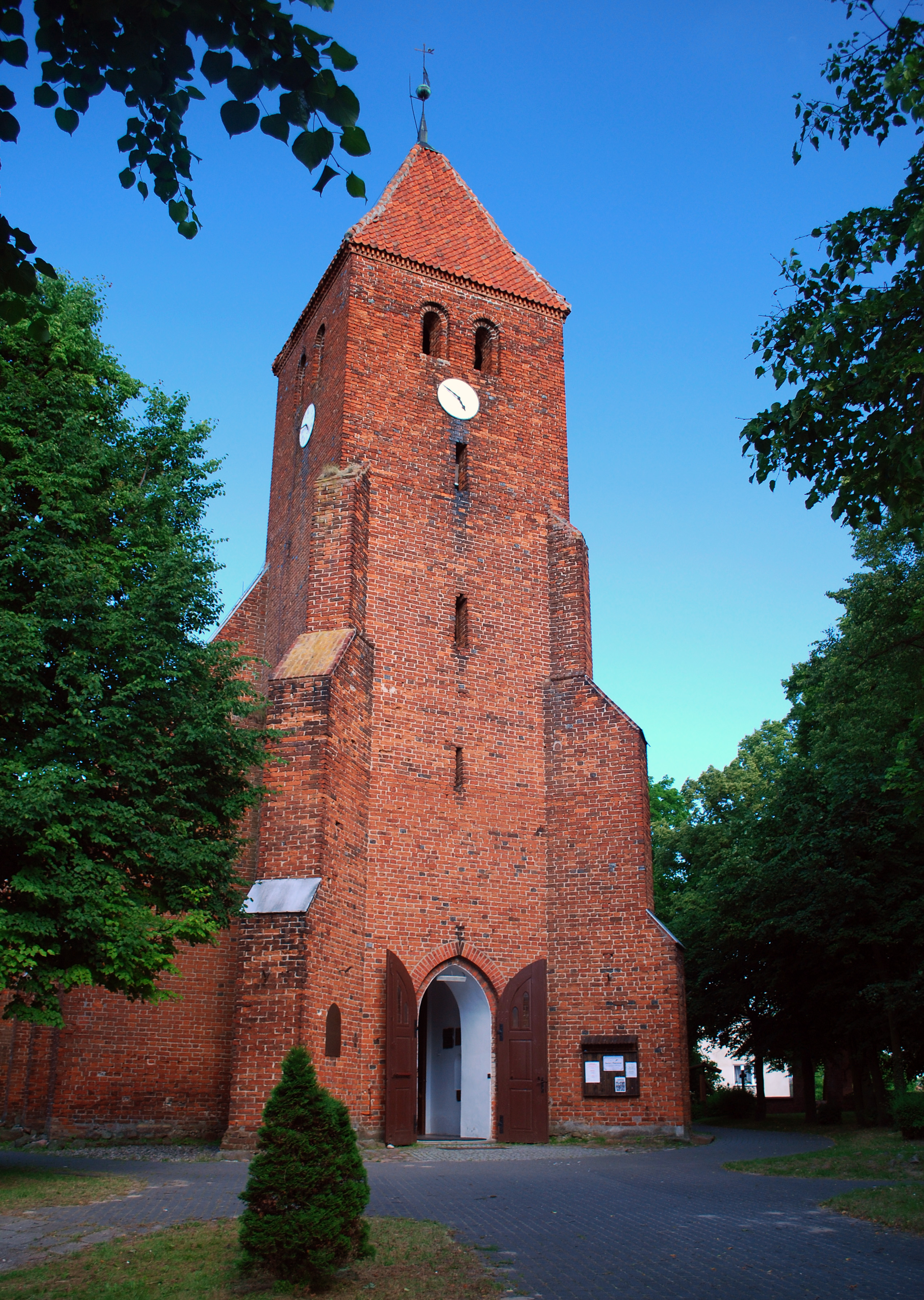
- Church of Saint Stanislaus

- Location within Poland
- Coordinates: 54°0′6″N 18°46′10″E
- Country: Poland
- Voivodeship: Pomeranian
- County: Tczew
- Gmina: Subkowy

Population
  - Total: 2,167
- Time zone: UTC+1 (CET)
  - Summer (DST): UTC+2 (CEST)
- Vehicle registration: GTC

Subkowy [supˈkɔvɨ] is a village in Tczew County, Pomeranian Voivodeship, in northern Poland. It is the seat of the gmina (administrative district) called Gmina Subkowy. It is located within the ethnocultural region of Kociewie in the historic region of Pomerania.

== History ==
Subkowy was a private church village of the Diocese of Włocławek, administratively located in the Tczew County in the Pomeranian Voivodeship of the Kingdom of Poland.

During the German occupation of Poland (World War II), several Poles from Subkowy, including teachers, were among the victims of large massacres of Poles carried out by the Germans in the Szpęgawski Forest in 1939 as part of the Intelligenzaktion.

== Transport ==
The Polish National road 91 runs through the village, and there is a railway station, located on the important Polish railway line No. 131, which is part of the Polish Coal Trunk-Line, which connects the port city of Gdynia in northern Poland with the Upper Silesian Industrial Region in southern Poland.
