= Morzeszczyn =

Village in Pomeranian Voivodeship, Poland

- Village
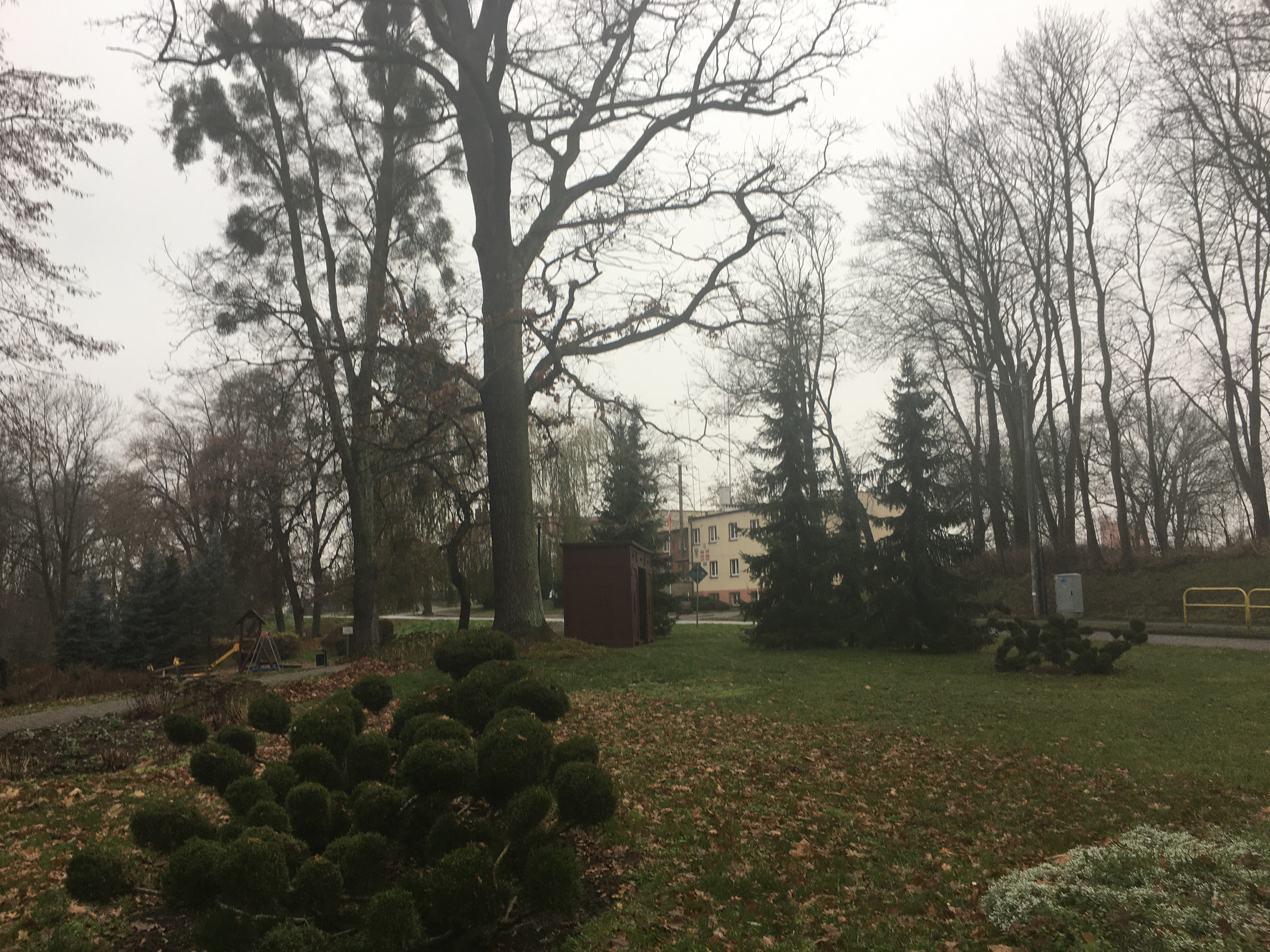

- Location within Poland
- Coordinates: 53°50′23″N 18°41′27″E
- Country: Poland
- Voivodeship: Pomeranian
- County: Tczew
- Gmina: Morzeszczyn
- Population (2022): 729
- Time zone: UTC+1 (CET)
  - Summer (DST): UTC+2 (CEST)
- Vehicle registration: GTC

Morzeszczyn (Polish: [mɔˈʐɛʂt͡ʂɨn]) is a village in Tczew County, Pomeranian Voivodeship, in northern Poland. It is the seat of the gmina (administrative district) called Gmina Morzeszczyn. It is located within the ethnocultural region of Kociewie in the historic region of Pomerania.

== History ==
Morzeszczyn was a private church village of the monastery in Pelplin, administratively located in the Tczew County in the Pomeranian Voivodeship of the Polish Crown.

During the German occupation of Poland (World War II), Morzeszczyn was one of the sites of executions of Poles, carried out by the Germans in 1939 as part of the Intelligenzaktion, and local Polish teachers were also murdered in the Szpęgawski Forest.

== Transport ==
The Polish Voivodeship roads 220, 234 and 644 run through the village.

Morzeszczyn railway station is located on the important Polish railway line No. 131, part of the Polish Coal Trunk-Line, which connects the port city of Gdynia in northern Poland with the Upper Silesian Industrial Region in southern Poland. Line 244 previously ran from Morzeszczyn to Gniew, via Brodzkie Młyny and Brody Pomorskie stations, until its closure in 1992.
