= Gniew railway station =

Former railway station in Gniew, Poland

Gniew
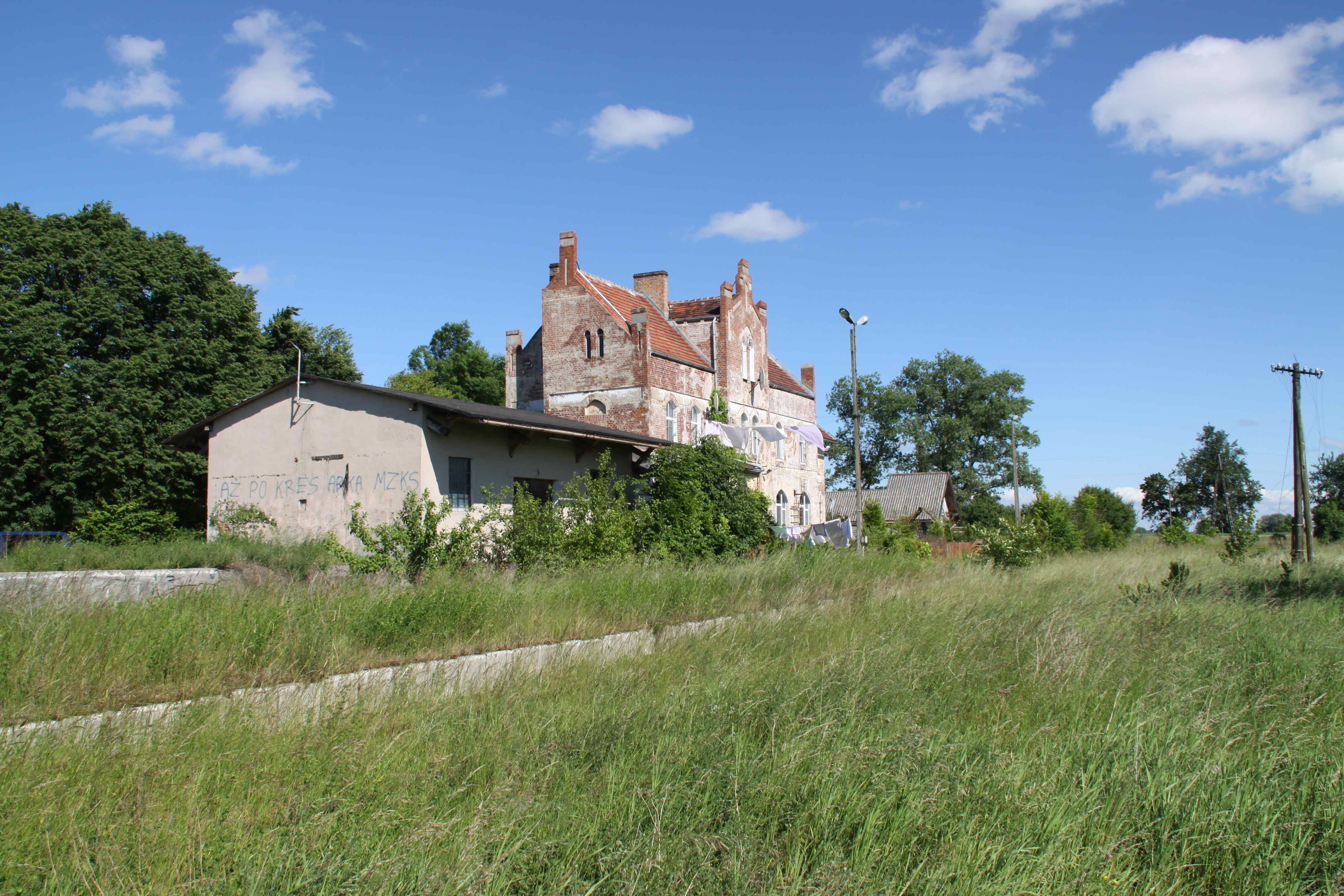
- View of the former railway station buildings and platform.

General information
- Location: Gniew; Poland
- Coordinates: 53°49′59″N 18°49′03″E
- Owner: Polskie Koleje Państwowe S.A.

Construction
- Structure type: Building: Residential housing Depot: Demolished; Water tower: Demolished

History
- Opened: 1905
- Former names: Mewe until 1945
Location

Gniew is a closed PKP railway station in Gniew (Pomeranian Voivodeship), Poland.

== History ==
The idea of connecting Gniew to the railway network was initially rejected in the mid-19th century as the town already had good transport connections via the Vistula to Nowe and Świecie. By the end of the century it was believed that the lack of a rail connection was having a negative economic effect on the town, and in 1897 ℳ45,000 were raised by citizens of Gniew to unsuccessfully fund one. Only 55 years after the construction of the Prussian Eastern Railway were residents of the town successful in their campaign to have Gniew connected by branchline to Morzeszczyn. Built in a Neo-Gothic style Gniew station opened on 5 January 1905. Operating as the terminus on line 244 trains departing Gniew stopped at Brodzkie Młyny and Brody Pomorskie stations before arriving at their destination.

=== Closure ===
The last passenger service left Gniew station on 10 July 1989 with freight services ending in 1992.

Start station	End station	Line type
Gniew	Morzeszczyn	Passenger/Freight
