= Ulgany =

Settlement in Kociewie

- Przysiółek
- Location within Poland
- Coordinates: 53°49′23″N 18°42′5″E
- Country: Poland
- Voivodeship: Pomeranian
- County: Tczew
- Gmina: Morzeszczyn
- Time zone: UTC+1 (CET)
  - Summer (DST): UTC+2 (CEST)
- Vehicle registration: GTC

Ulgany [ulˈɡanɨ] is a przysiółek in the administrative district of Gmina Morzeszczyn, within Tczew County, Pomeranian Voivodeship, in northern Poland. It is located within the ethnocultural region of Kociewie in the historic region of Pomerania.
