= Gmina Morzeszczyn =

Gmina Morzeszczyn Morzeszczyn Commune
- Gmina
- Coat of arms

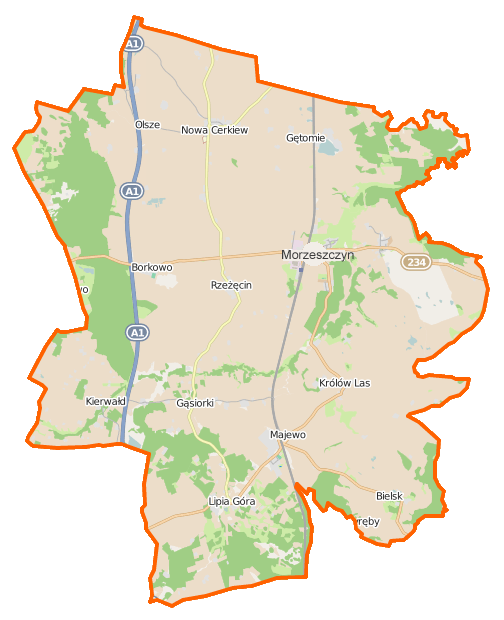
- Coordinates (Morzeszczyn): 53°50′23″N 18°41′27″E
- Country: Poland
- Voivodeship: Pomeranian
- County: Tczew
- Seat: Morzeszczyn

Area
  - Total: 91.22 km^{2} (35.22 sq mi)

Population (2022)
  - Total: 3,513
  - Density: 38.51/km^{2} (99.74/sq mi)
- Website: http://www.morzeszczyn.pl/www2/index.php?option=com_content&task=view&id=107&Itemid=94

Gmina Morzeszczyn is a rural area in Gmina, (administrative district) Tczew County, Pomeranian Voivodeship, in northern Poland. Its seat is the village of Morzeszczyn, which lies approximately 29 kilometres (18 mi) south of Tczew and 59 km (37 mi) south of the regional capital Gdańsk.

The Gmina covers an area of 91.22 square kilometres (35.2 sq mi), and as of 2022 its total population is 3,513.

== Villages ==
Gmina Morzeszczyn contains the villages and settlements of Bielsk, Borkowo, Borkowo Leśne, Brzeźno, Dzierżążno, Gąsiorki, Gętomie, Kierwałd, Królów Las, Lipia Góra, Majewo, Morzeszczyn, Nowa Cerkiew, Olsze, Olszówka, Piła, Rzeżęcin, Rzeżęcin-Pole, Suchownia, and Ulgany.

== Neighbouring gminas ==
Gmina Morzeszczyn is bordered by the gminas of Bobowo, Gniew, Pelplin, Skórcz, and Smętowo Graniczne.
