= Rzeżęcin =

Village in Pomeranian Voivodeship, Poland

- Village
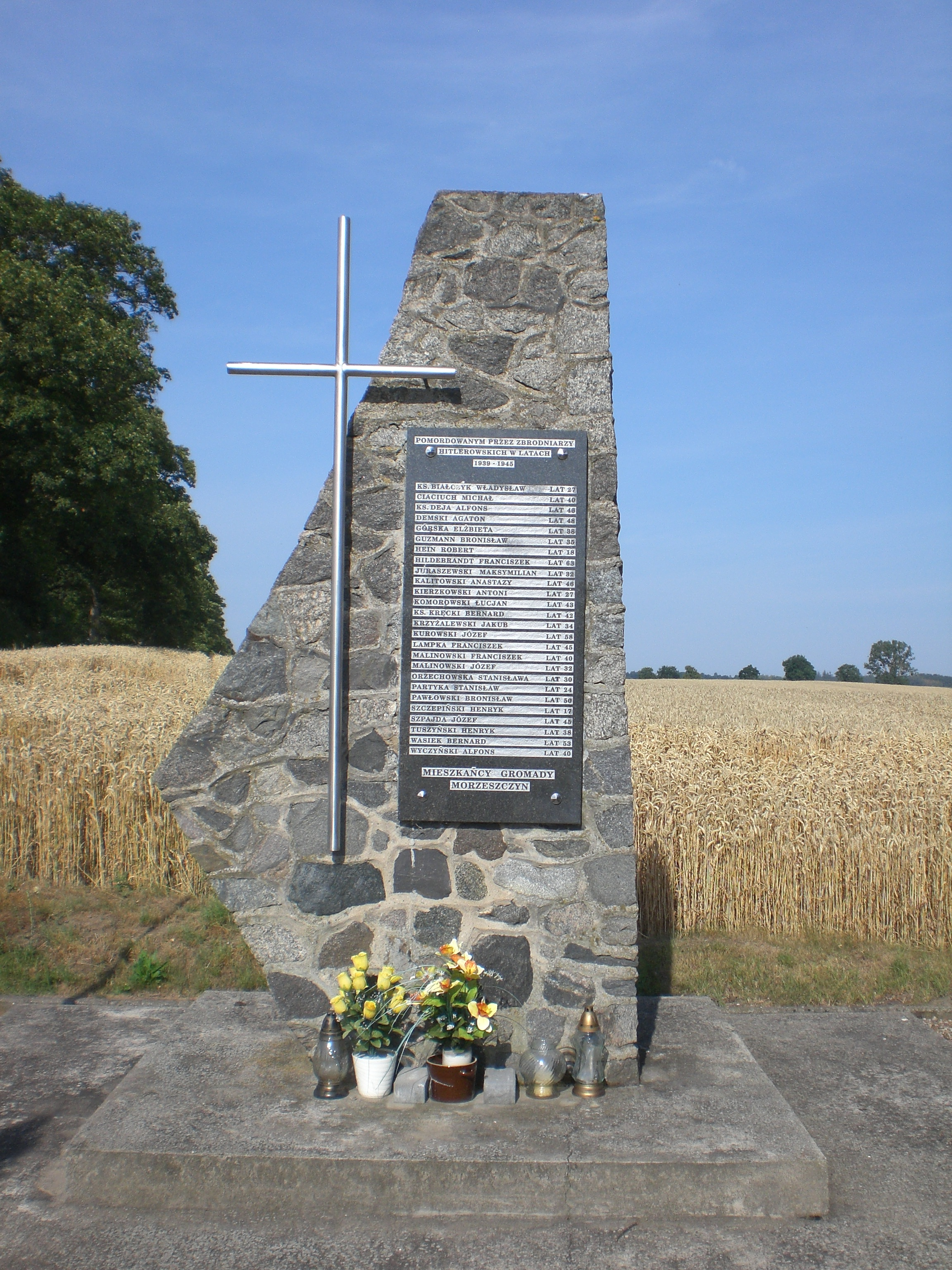
- Monument to local Poles murdered by Nazi Germany during World War II

- Location within Poland
- Coordinates: 53°49′57″N 18°39′55″E
- Country: Poland
- Voivodeship: Pomeranian
- County: Tczew
- Gmina: Morzeszczyn
- Population (2022): 272
- Time zone: UTC+1 (CET)
  - Summer (DST): UTC+2 (CEST)
- Vehicle registration: GTC
- Website: http://www.rzezecin.pl/

Rzeżęcin [ʐɛˈʐɛnt͡ɕin] is a village in the administrative district of Gmina Morzeszczyn, within Tczew County, Pomeranian Voivodeship, in northern Poland. It is located within the ethnocultural region of Kociewie in the historic region of Pomerania.

== History ==
Rzeżęcin was a private church village of the monastery in Pelplin, administratively located in the Tczew County in the Pomeranian Voivodeship of the Polish Crown.

During the German occupation of Poland (World War II), in 1939, teachers from Rzeżęcin were murdered by the Germans during the large massacres of Poles carried out in the Szpęgawski Forest as part of the Intelligenzaktion. In 1941, the occupiers carried out expulsions of Poles, whose farms were handed over to German colonists as part of the Lebensraum policy. Expelled Poles were enslaved as forced labour and sent either to Germany or to new German colonists in the region.

== Transport ==
The Polish Voivodeship road 641 runs through the village, and the A1 motorway runs nearby, west of the village.
