= Leśna Jania =

Village in Pomeranian Voivodeship, Poland

- Village
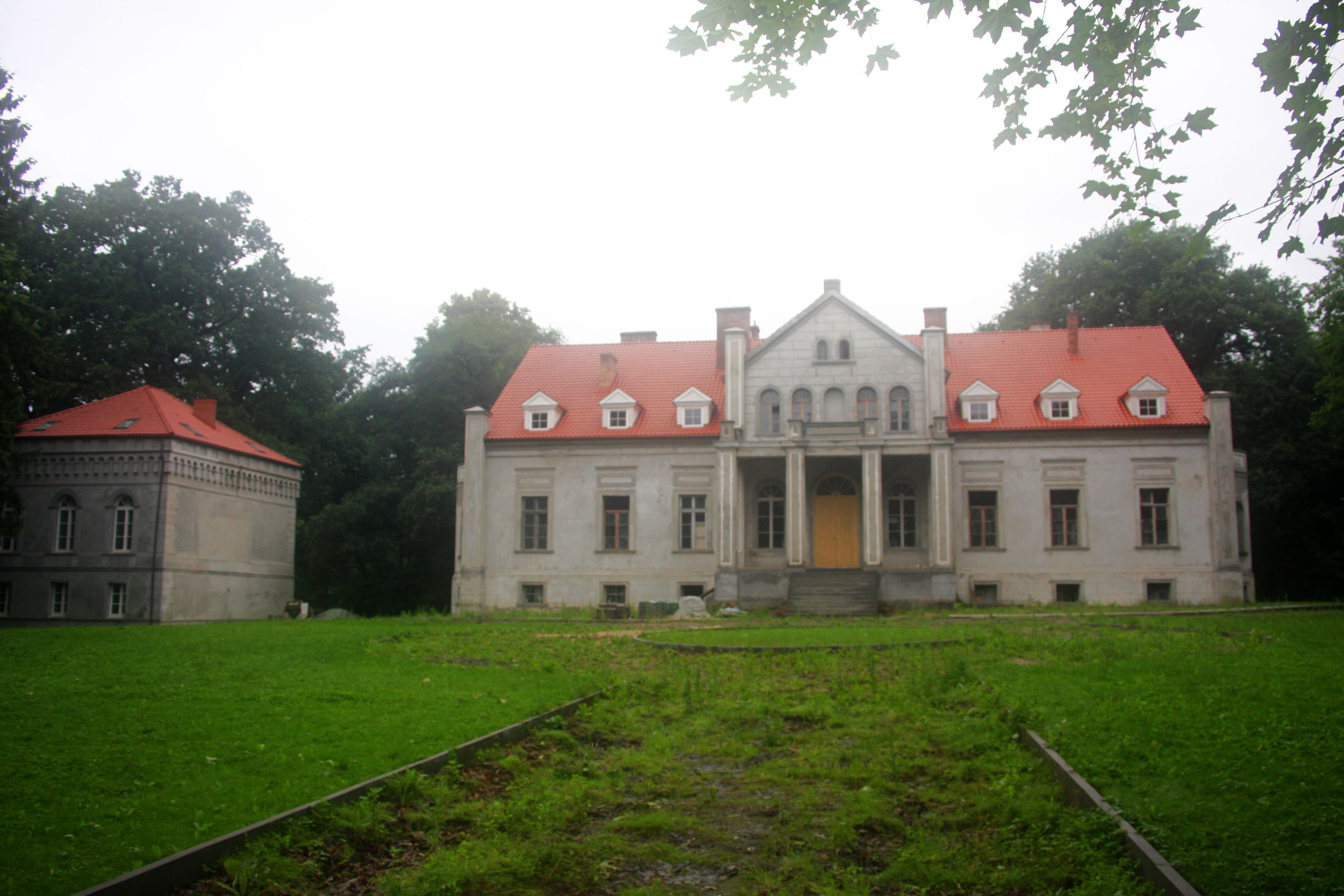
- Palace in Leśna Jania

- Location within Poland
- Coordinates: 53°43′12″N 18°36′20″E
- Country: Poland
- Voivodeship: Pomeranian
- County: Starogard
- Gmina: Smętowo Graniczne
- Population (2023): 323
- Time zone: UTC+1 (CET)
  - Summer (DST): UTC+2 (CEST)
- Vehicle registration: GST

Leśna Jania [ˈlɛɕna ˈjaɲa] is a village in the administrative district of Gmina Smętowo Graniczne, within Starogard County, Pomeranian Voivodeship, in northern Poland. It is located in the ethnocultural region of Kociewie in the historic region of Pomerania.

== History ==
Leśna Jania was a private village of the Konopacki noble family of Odwaga coat of arms, administratively located in the Nowe County in the Pomeranian Voivodeship of the Kingdom of Poland. It was annexed by Prussia in the First Partition of Poland in 1772. Following World War I, Poland regained independence and control of the village.

During the German occupation of Poland (World War II), Leśna Jania was one of the sites of executions of Poles, carried out by the Germans in 1939 as part of the Intelligenzaktion. Local Poles were also among the victims of the massacres in Zajączek, perpetrated by the German gendarmerie and Selbstschutz in 1939, also as part of the Intelligenzaktion.

== Transport ==
The Polish A1 motorway runs nearby, east of the village.
