= Piła, Pomeranian Voivodeship =

Village in Pomeranian Voivodeship, Poland

Piła
- Settlement
- Location within Poland
- Coordinates: 53°48′37″N 18°37′54″E
- Country: Poland
- Voivodeship: Pomeranian
- County: Tczew
- Gmina: Morzeszczyn
- Time zone: UTC+1 (CET)
  - Summer (DST): UTC+2 (CEST)
- Vehicle registration: GTC

Piła [ˈpiwa] is a settlement in the administrative district of Gmina Morzeszczyn, within Tczew County, Pomeranian Voivodeship, in northern Poland. It is located in the ethnocultural region of Kociewie in the historic region of Pomerania.
