= Frąca, Gmina Smętowo Graniczne =

Village in Pomeranian Voivodeship, Poland

Frąca
- Village
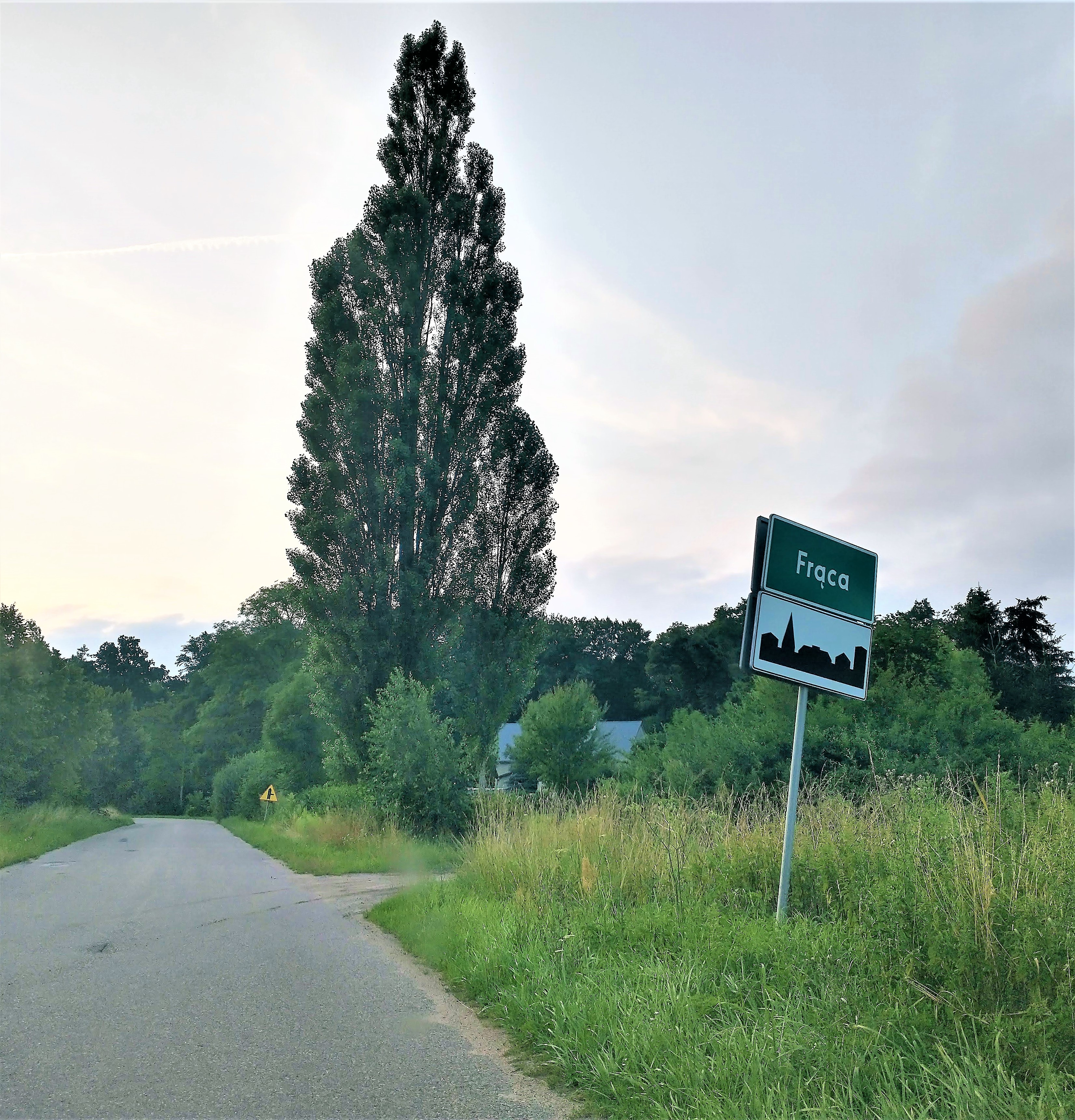

- Location within Poland
- Coordinates: 53°42′45″N 18°38′8″E
- Country: Poland
- Voivodeship: Pomeranian
- County: Starogard
- Gmina: Smętowo Graniczne
- Population (2023): 274
- Time zone: UTC+1 (CET)
  - Summer (DST): UTC+2 (CEST)
- Vehicle registration: GST

Frąca [ˈfrɔnt͡sa] is a village in the administrative district of Gmina Smętowo Graniczne, within Starogard County, Pomeranian Voivodeship, in northern Poland. It is located within the ethnocultural region of Kociewie in the historic region of Pomerania.
