= Olszówka, Tczew County =

Village in Pomeranian Voivodeship, Poland

Olszówka
- Village
- Location within Poland
- Coordinates: 53°49′11″N 18°39′4″E
- Country: Poland
- Voivodeship: Pomeranian
- County: Tczew
- Gmina: Morzeszczyn
- Time zone: UTC+1 (CET)
  - Summer (DST): UTC+2 (CEST)
- Vehicle registration: GTC

Olszówka [ɔlˈʂufka] is a village in the administrative district of Gmina Morzeszczyn, within Tczew County, Pomeranian Voivodeship, in northern Poland. It is located within the ethnocultural region of Kociewie in the historic region of Pomerania.
