= Borkowo Leśne =

Settlement in Kociewie

- Hamlet
- Location within Poland
- Coordinates: 53°50′24″N 18°37′07″E
- Country: Poland
- Voivodeship: Pomeranian
- County: Tczew
- Gmina: Morzeszczyn
- Time zone: UTC+1 (CET)
  - Summer (DST): UTC+2 (CEST)
- Postal code: 83-132
- SIMC: 0167600
- Vehicle registration: GTC

Borkowo Leśne [bɔrˈkɔvɔ lɛɕnɛ] is a hamlet in the administrative district of Gmina Morzeszczyn within Tczew County, Pomeranian Voivodeship of northern Poland. It is located in the ethnocultural region of Kociewie.
