= Dzierżążno, Tczew County =

Village in Pomeranian Voivodeship, Poland

Dzierżążno
- Village
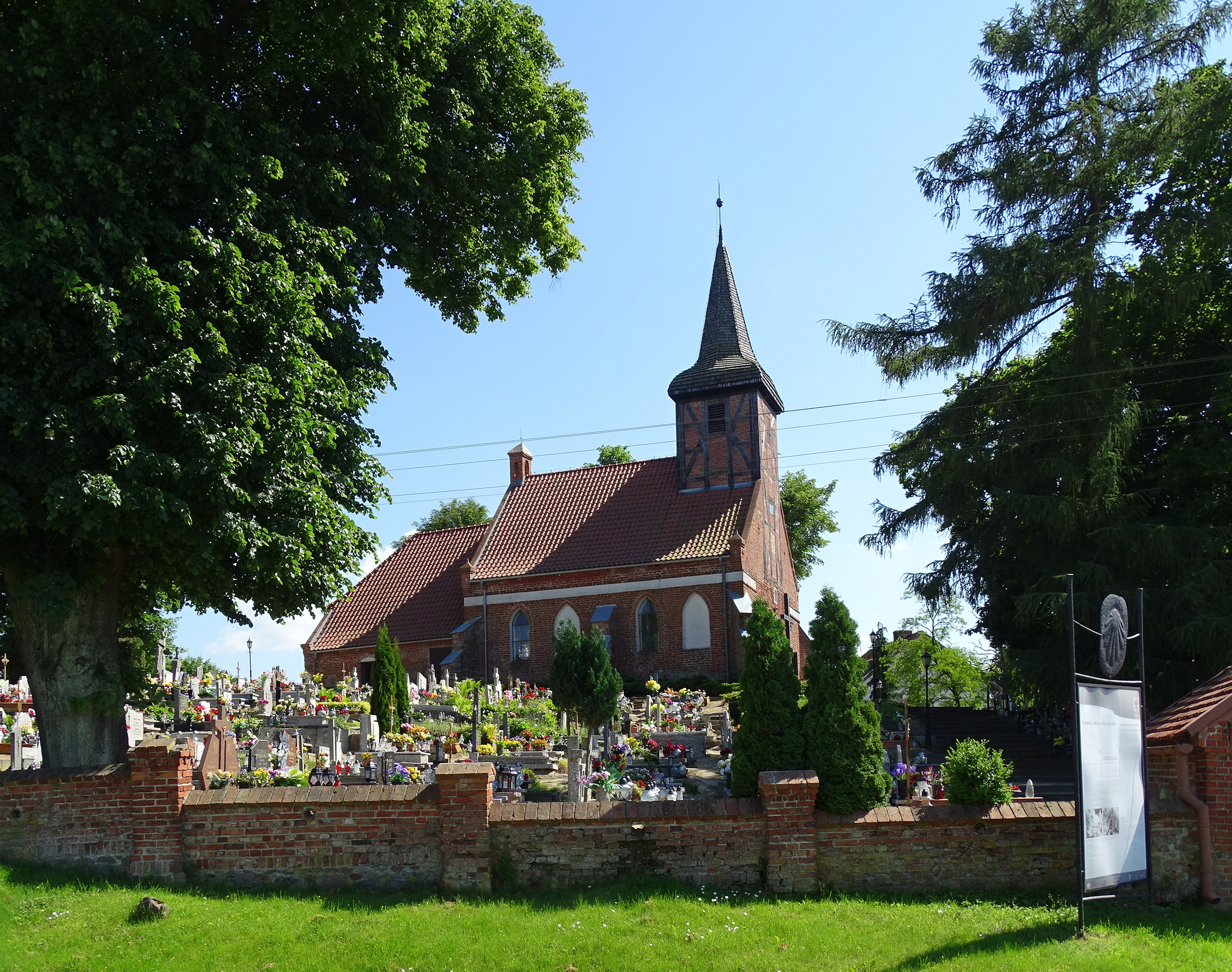
- Church of Saint Jacob in Dzierżążno

- Location within Poland
- Coordinates: 53°50′29″N 18°42′48″E
- Country: Poland
- Voivodeship: Pomeranian
- County: Tczew
- Gmina: Morzeszczyn
- Population (2022): 295
- Time zone: UTC+1 (CET)
  - Summer (DST): UTC+2 (CEST)
- Vehicle registration: GTC

Dzierżążno [d͡ʑɛrˈʐɔ̃ʐnɔ] is a village in the administrative district of Gmina Morzeszczyn, within Tczew County, Pomeranian Voivodeship, in northern Poland. It is located within the ethnocultural region of Kociewie in the historic region of Pomerania.

Dzierżążno was a private church village of the Diocese of Włocławek, administratively located in the Tczew County in the Pomeranian Voivodeship of the Kingdom of Poland.
