= Bielsk, Pomeranian Voivodeship =

Village in Pomeranian Voivodeship, Poland

Bielsk
- Village
- Location within Poland
- Coordinates: 53°47′25″N 18°43′15″E
- Country: Poland
- Voivodeship: Pomeranian
- County: Tczew
- Gmina: Morzeszczyn

Population (2022)
  - Total: 93
- Time zone: UTC+1 (CET)
  - Summer (DST): UTC+2 (CEST)
- Vehicle registration: GTC

Bielsk [bjɛlsk] is a village in the administrative district of Gmina Morzeszczyn within Tczew County, Pomeranian Voivodeship of northern Poland. It is located in the ethnocultural region of Kociewie in the historic region of Pomerania.
