= Brody Pomorskie railway station =

Former railway station in Poland

Brody Pomorskie

General information
- Location: Brody; Poland
- Owner: Polskie Koleje Państwowe S.A.
- Line: 244

History
- Opened: 1905
- Former names: Deutsch Brodden until 1945
Location
- Location within Pomeranian Voivodeship Location within Poland

Brody Pomorskie is a closed PKP railway station in Brody Pomorskie, Poland.

== History ==
The construction of a rail connection through the nearby town of Gniew was initially rejected when first proposed in the nineteenth century, due to the town's maritime transport connections along the Vistula. Following the construction of the Prussian Eastern Railway residents of Gniew campaigned to have the town connected by branchline to Morzeszczyn, the resultant railway ran through Brody Pomorskie. The station, and surrounding residential buildings, opened in 1905. The station building at Brody Pomorskie was built to the same design specifications as its twin station further along the line at Brodzkie Młyny. Due to national border changes the station had various name changes in the twentieth-century including Deutsch Brodden (German Empire), Brody Niemieckie (Second Polish Republic), and Deutsch-Brodden (Nazi Germany).

=== Closure ===
The last passenger service ran through Brody Pomorskie station on 10 July 1989. By 2007 the tracks had been demolished and the station buildings repurposed. In 2010 a proposal was put forward by the local council of Gniew to take ownership of the defunct station at Brody Pomorskie in order for the railway line to be turned into a tourist cycle route.
