= Majewo, Tczew County =

Village in Pomeranian Voivodeship, Poland

Majewo
- Village
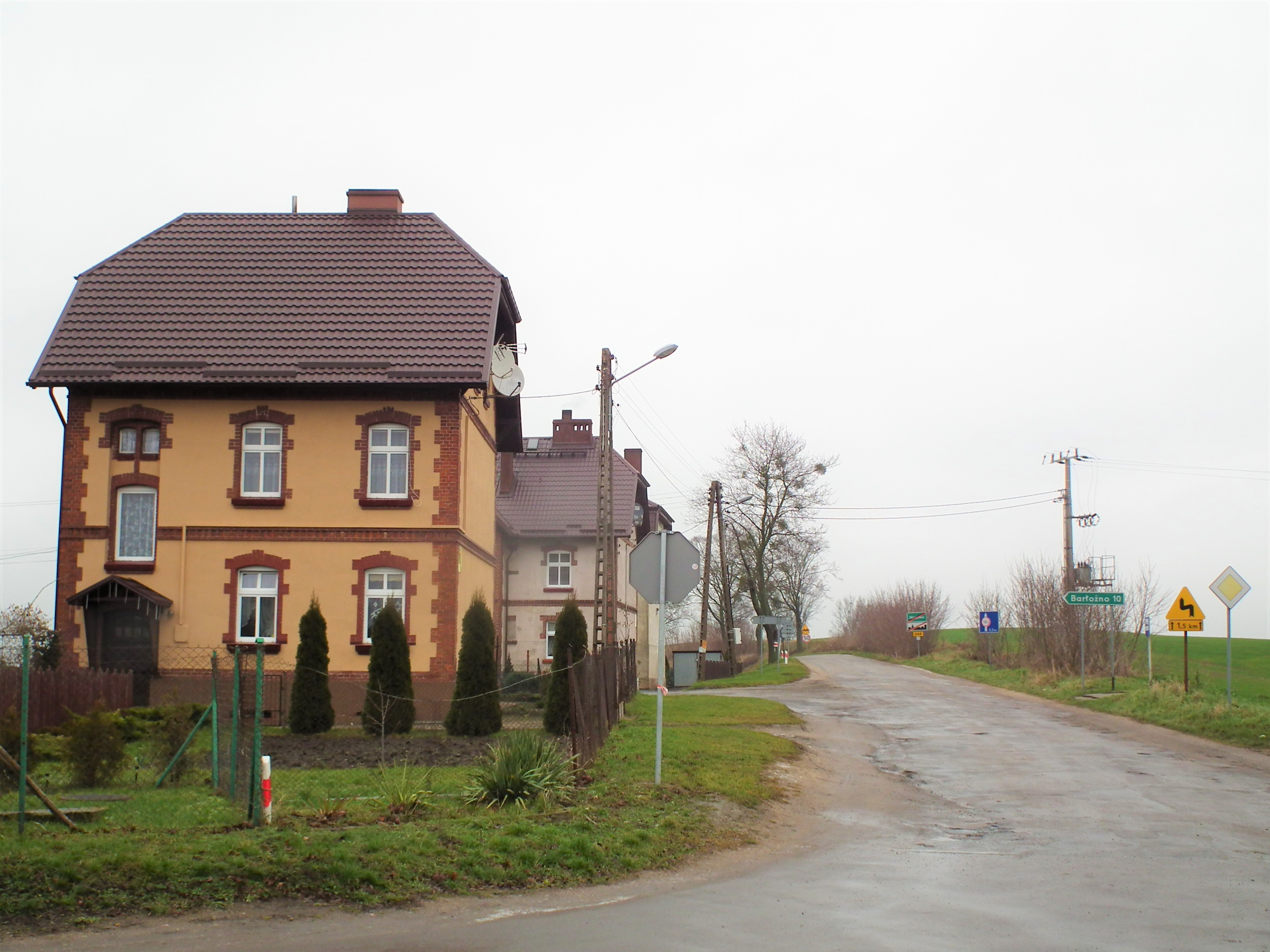

- Location within Poland
- Coordinates: 53°50′23″N 18°41′27″E
- Country: Poland
- Voivodeship: Pomeranian
- County: Tczew
- Gmina: Morzeszczyn

Population (2022)
  - Total: 410
- Time zone: UTC+1 (CET)
  - Summer (DST): UTC+2 (CEST)
- Vehicle registration: GTC

Majewo [maˈjɛvɔ] is a village in the administrative district of Gmina Morzeszczyn, within Tczew County, Pomeranian Voivodeship, in northern Poland. It is located within the ethnocultural region of Kociewie in the historic region of Pomerania.
