= Stara Jania =

Village in Pomeranian Voivodeship, Poland

- Village
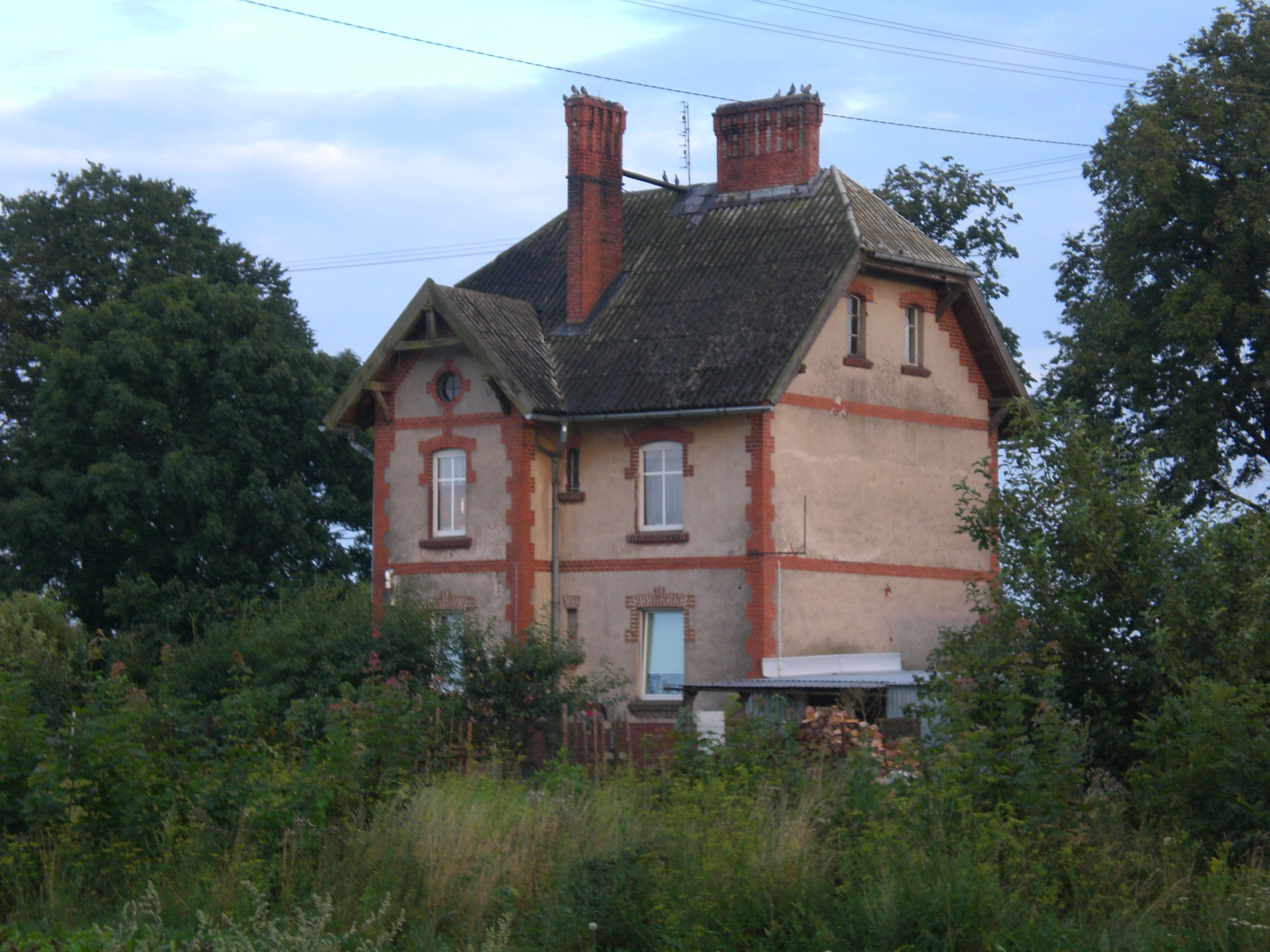
- The former railway station building at Stara Jania

- Location within Poland
- Coordinates: 53°44′41″N 18°35′47″E
- Country: Poland
- Voivodeship: Pomeranian
- County: Starogard
- Gmina: Smętowo Graniczne

Population (2023)
  - Total: 346
- Time zone: UTC+1 (CET)
  - Summer (DST): UTC+2 (CEST)
- Vehicle registration: GST

Stara Jania [ˈstara ˈjaɲa] is a village in the administrative district of Gmina Smętowo Graniczne, within Starogard County, Pomeranian Voivodeship, in northern Poland. It is located in the ethnocultural region of Kociewie in the historic region of Pomerania.
