= Nowa Cerkiew, Tczew County =

Village in Pomeranian Voivodeship, Poland

Nowa Cerkiew
- Village
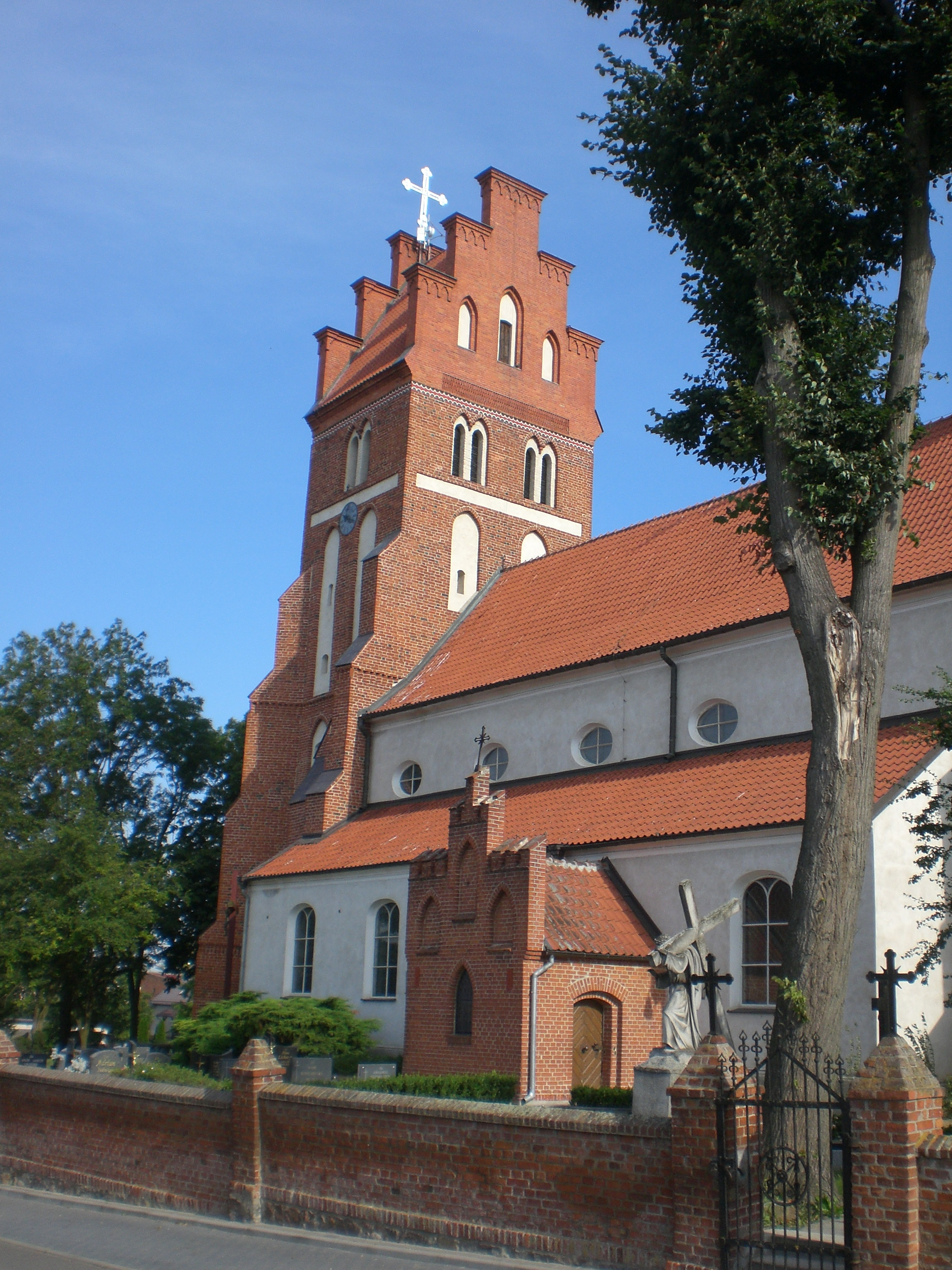
- Church of the Assumption in Nowa Cerkiew

- Location within Poland
- Coordinates: 53°51′58″N 18°39′27″E
- Country: Poland
- Voivodeship: Pomeranian
- County: Tczew
- Gmina: Morzeszczyn
- Population (2022): 428
- Time zone: UTC+1 (CET)
  - Summer (DST): UTC+2 (CEST)
- Vehicle registration: GTC

Nowa Cerkiew [ˈnɔva ˈt͡sɛrkʲɛf] is a village in the administrative district of Gmina Morzeszczyn, within Tczew County, Pomeranian Voivodeship, in northern Poland. It is located within the ethnocultural region of Kociewie in the historic region of Pomerania.

Nowa Cerkiew was a private church village of the monastery in Pelplin, administratively located in the Tczew County in the Pomeranian Voivodeship of the Kingdom of Poland.

== Transport ==
The Polish A1 motorway runs nearby, west of the village.
