= Słuchacz =

Village in Pomeranian Voivodeship, Poland

- Settlement
- Location within Poland
- Coordinates: 53°43′17″N 18°35′2″E
- Country: Poland
- Voivodeship: Pomeranian
- County: Starogard
- Gmina: Smętowo Graniczne

Population
  - Total: 70
- Time zone: UTC+1 (CET)
  - Summer (DST): UTC+2 (CEST)
- Vehicle registration: GST

Słuchacz [ˈswuxat͡ʂ] is a settlement in the administrative district of Gmina Smętowo Graniczne, within Starogard County, Pomeranian Voivodeship, in northern Poland. It is located in the ethnocultural region of Kociewie in the historic region of Pomerania.
