= Gmina Smętowo Graniczne =

Gmina Smętowo Graniczne Smętowo Graniczne Commune
- Gmina
- Coat of arms
- Interactive map of Gmina Smętowo Graniczne
- Coordinates (Smętowo Graniczne): 53°44′42″N 18°41′3″E
- Country: Poland
- Voivodeship: Pomeranian
- County: Starogard
- Seat: Smętowo Graniczne

Area
  - Total: 86.12 km^{2} (33.25 sq mi)

Population (2023)
  - Total: 4,984
  - Density: 57.87/km^{2} (149.9/sq mi)
- Website: http://www.smetowo.pl

Gmina Smętowo Graniczne is a rural gmina (administrative district) in Starogard County, Pomeranian Voivodeship, in northern Poland. Its seat is the village of Smętowo Graniczne, which lies approximately 27 kilometres (17 mi) south of Starogard Gdański and 70 km (43 mi) south of the regional capital Gdańsk.

The gmina covers an area of 86.12 square kilometres (33.3 sq mi), and as of 2023 its total population is 4,984.

== Villages ==
Gmina Smętowo Graniczne contains the villages and settlements of Bobrowiec, Czerwińsk, Frąca, Grabowiec, Kamionka, Kopytkowo, Kornatka, Kościelna Jania, Kulmaga, Lalkowy, Leśna Jania, Luchowo, Rudawki, Rynkówka, Słuchacz, Smarzewo, Smętówko, Smętowo Graniczne, Stara Jania and Stary Bobrowiec.

== Neighbouring gminas ==
Gmina Smętowo Graniczne is bordered by the gminas of Gniew, Morzeszczyn, Nowe, Osiek and Skórcz.
