= Luchowo, Pomeranian Voivodeship =

Village in Pomeranian Voivodeship, Poland

Luchowo
- Village
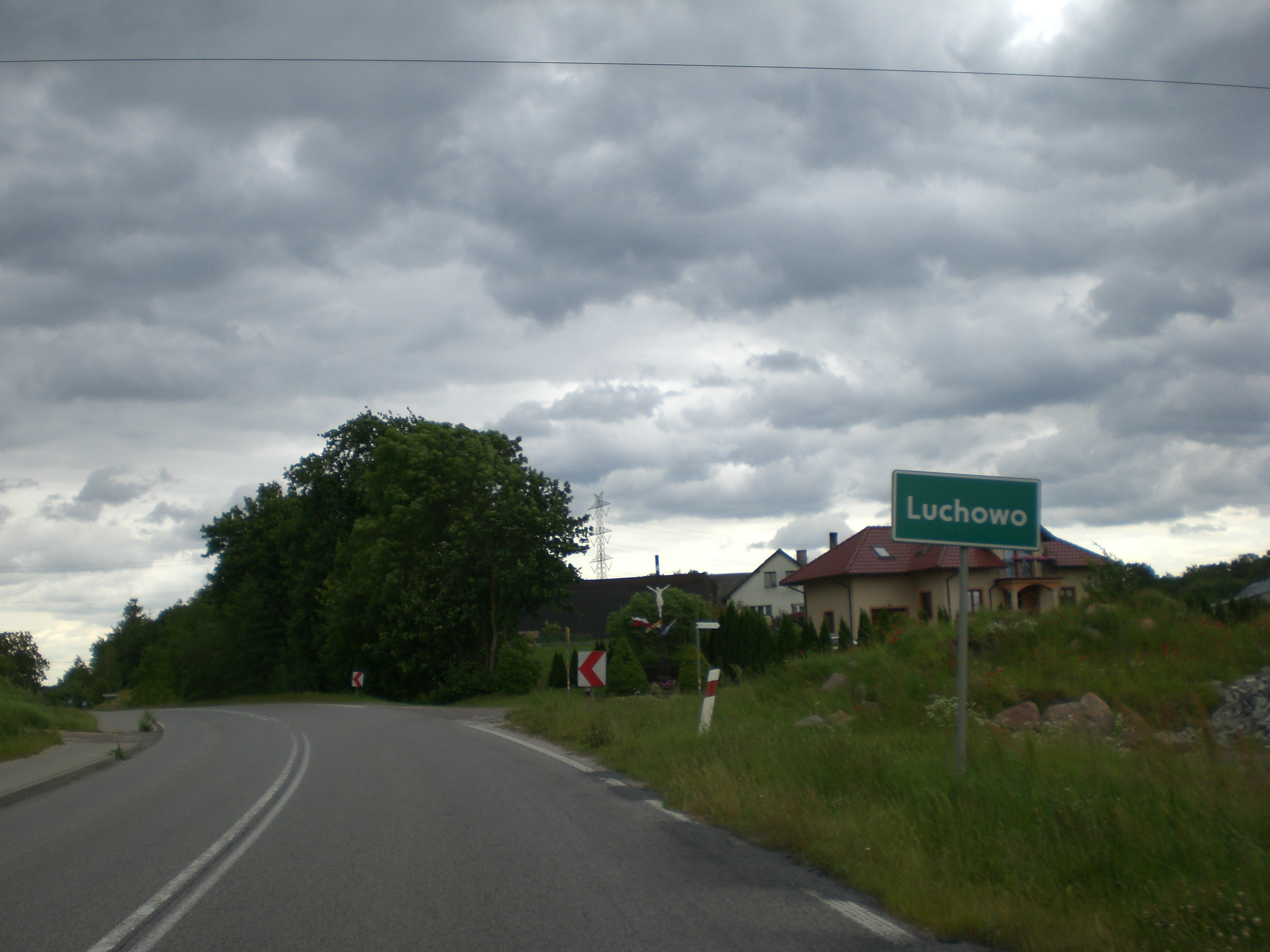

- Location within Poland
- Coordinates: 53°44′21″N 18°41′50″E
- Country: Poland
- Voivodeship: Pomeranian
- County: Starogard
- Gmina: Smętowo Graniczne
- Population (2023): 153
- Time zone: UTC+1 (CET)
  - Summer (DST): UTC+2 (CEST)
- Vehicle registration: GST

Luchowo [luˈxɔvɔ] is a village in the administrative district of Gmina Smętowo Graniczne, within Starogard County, Pomeranian Voivodeship, in northern Poland. It is located within the ethnocultural region of Kociewie in the historic region of Pomerania.
