= Borkowo, Tczew County =

Village in Pomeranian Voivodeship, Poland

Borkowo
- Village
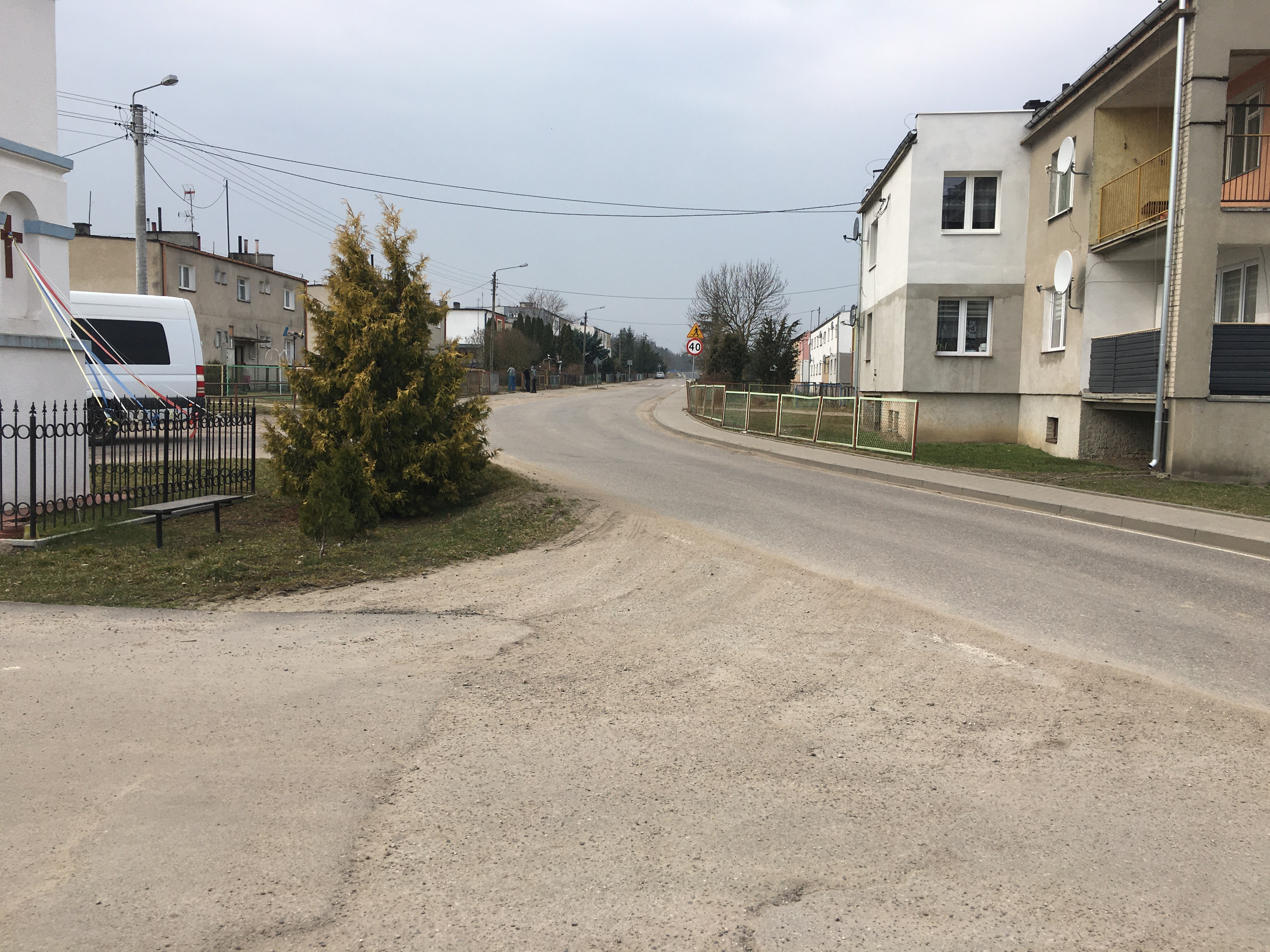

- Location within Poland
- Coordinates: 53°50′14″N 18°38′6″E
- Country: Poland
- Voivodeship: Pomeranian
- County: Tczew
- Gmina: Morzeszczyn
- Population (2022): 314
- Time zone: UTC+1 (CET)
  - Summer (DST): UTC+2 (CEST)
- Vehicle registration: GTC

Borkowo [bɔrˈkɔvɔ] is a village in the administrative district of Gmina Morzeszczyn, within Tczew County, Pomeranian Voivodeship, in northern Poland. It is located within the ethnocultural region of Kociewie in the historic region of Pomerania.

Borkowo was a private church village of the monastery in Pelplin, administratively located in the Tczew County in the Pomeranian Voivodeship of the Kingdom of Poland.

== Transport ==
The Polish A1 motorway and the Voivodeship road 234 run through the village.
