= Kopytkowo, Pomeranian Voivodeship =

Village in Pomeranian Voivodeship, Poland

Kopytkowo
- Village
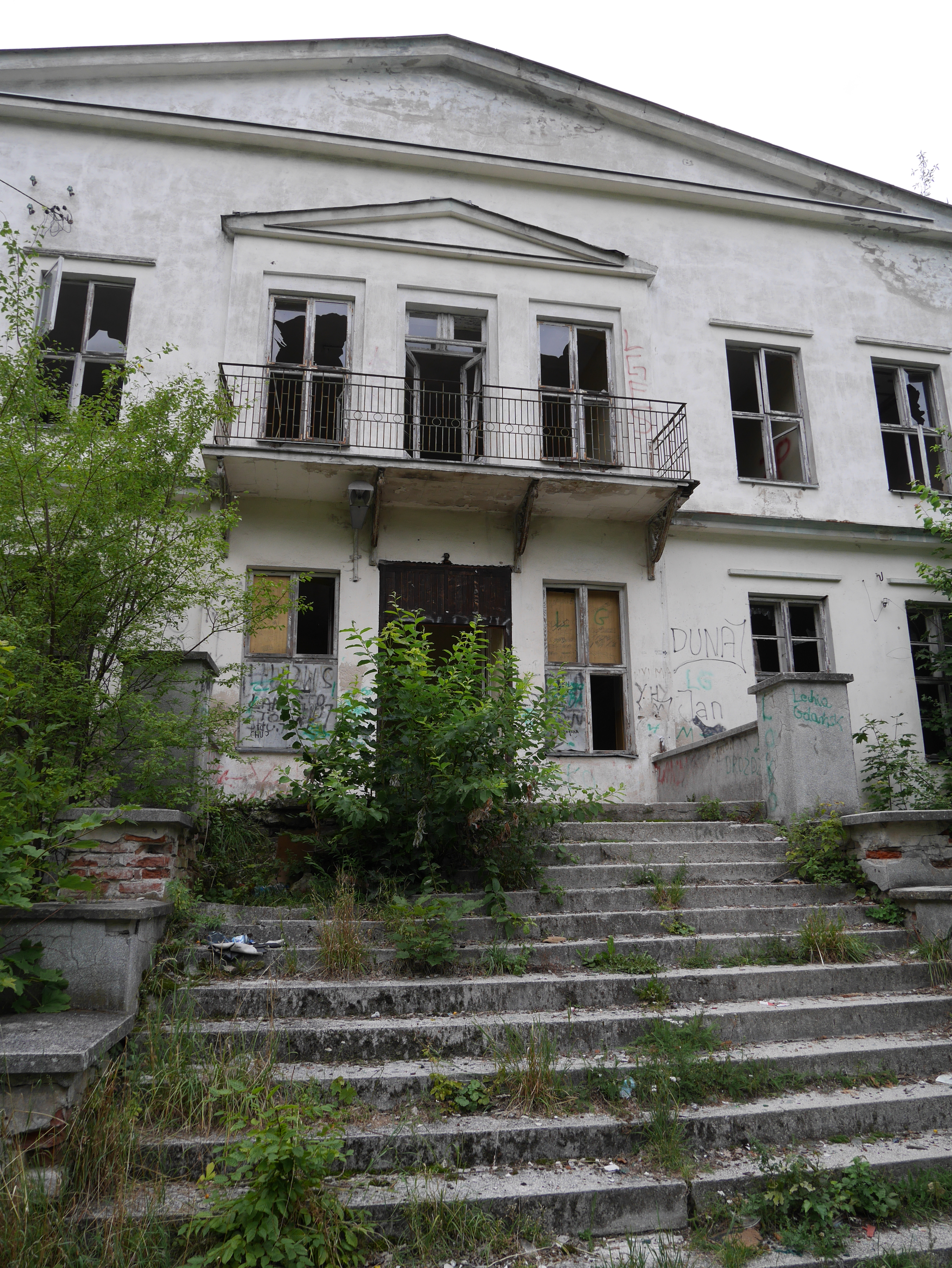
- An abandoned 19th century residence in Kopytkowo. The graffiti on the newel signifies local allegiance to the football club Lechia Gdańsk

- Location within Poland
- Coordinates: 53°44′14″N 18°38′57″E
- Country: Poland
- Voivodeship: Pomeranian
- County: Starogard
- Gmina: Smętowo Graniczne
- Population (2023): 716
- Time zone: UTC+1 (CET)
  - Summer (DST): UTC+2 (CEST)
- Vehicle registration: GST

Kopytkowo [kɔpɨtˈkɔvɔ] is a village in the administrative district of Gmina Smętowo Graniczne, within Starogard County, Pomeranian Voivodeship, in northern Poland. It is located within the ethnocultural region of Kociewie in the historic region of Pomerania.
