= Smętowo Graniczne =

Village in Pomeranian Voivodeship, Poland

- Village
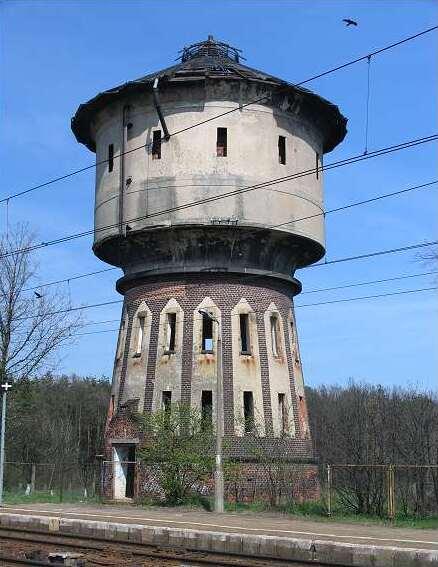
- The water tower at the village's station

- Location within Poland
- Coordinates: 53°44′42″N 18°41′3″E
- Country: Poland
- Voivodeship: Pomeranian
- County: Starogard
- Gmina: Smętowo Graniczne

Population (2023)
  - Total: 1,614
- Time zone: UTC+1 (CET)
  - Summer (DST): UTC+2 (CEST)
- Vehicle registration: GST

Smętowo Graniczne [smɛnˈtɔvɔ ɡraˈnit͡ʂnɛ] is a village in Starogard County, Pomeranian Voivodeship, in northern Poland. It is the seat of the gmina (administrative district) called Gmina Smętowo Graniczne. It is located in the ethnocultural region of Kociewie in the historic region of Pomerania.

== Notable residents ==
- Kurt Feldt (1887–1970), German general
