= Brody Pomorskie =

Village in Pomeranian Voivodeship, Poland

- Village
- Location within Poland
- Coordinates: 53°51′38″N 18°45′39″E
- Country: Poland
- Voivodeship: Pomeranian
- County: Tczew
- Gmina: Gniew

Population
  - Total: 307
- Time zone: UTC+1 (CET)
  - Summer (DST): UTC+2 (CEST)
- Vehicle registration: GTC

Brody Pomorskie [ˈbrɔdɨ] is a village in Gmina Gniew, Tczew County, Pomeranian Voivodeship, northern Poland. Brody Pomorskie is located in the ethnocultural region of Kociewie in the historic region of Pomerania.

== Transport ==
The village was historically served by Brody Pomorskie railway station, which was closed in the late twentieth century.
