= Brzeźno, Tczew County =

Village in Pomeranian Voivodeship, Poland

Brzeźno
- Settlement
- Location within Poland
- Coordinates: 53°51′23″N 18°35′25″E
- Country: Poland
- Voivodeship: Pomeranian
- County: Tczew
- Gmina: Morzeszczyn

Population (2022)
  - Total: 7
- Time zone: UTC+1 (CET)
  - Summer (DST): UTC+2 (CEST)
- Vehicle registration: GTC

Brzeźno [ˈbʐɛʑnɔ] is a settlement in the administrative district of Gmina Morzeszczyn, within Tczew County, Pomeranian Voivodeship, in northern Poland. It is located in the ethnocultural region of Kociewie in the historic region of Pomerania.
