= Lalkowy =

Village in Pomeranian Voivodeship, Poland

Lalkowy Puppendorf
- Village
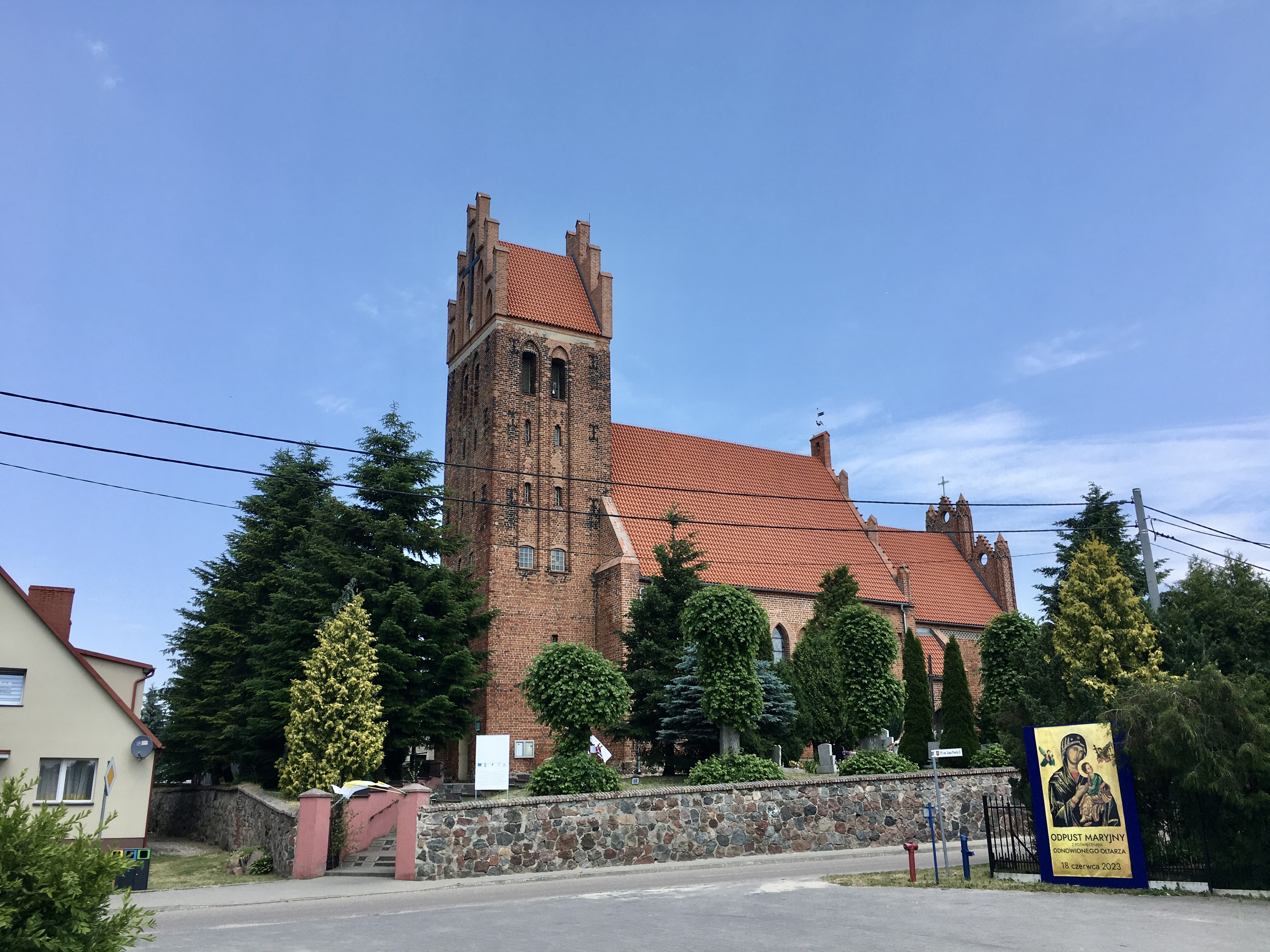
- Saint Barbara's church in Lalkowy

- Location within Poland
- Coordinates: 53°42′29″N 18°40′43″E
- Country: Poland
- Voivodeship: Pomeranian
- County: Starogard
- Gmina: Smętowo Graniczne

Population (2023)
  - Total: 217
- Time zone: UTC+1 (CET)
  - Summer (DST): UTC+2 (CEST)
- Postal code: 83-230
- SIMC: 0172273
- Vehicle registration: GST

Lalkowy [lalˈkɔvɨ] (Kocievian: Puppendorf; formerly German: Lalkau) is a village in the administrative district of Gmina Smętowo Graniczne, within Starogard County, Pomeranian Voivodeship, in northern Poland. It is located in the ethnocultural region of Kociewie in the historic region of Pomerania.

There are three registered monuments in Lalkowy including the medieval Gothic church of Saint Barbara, its cemetery, and an historic wall. The Lalkowy Centre of Kociewian Culture (Polish: Centrum Kultury Kociewskiej Lalkowy) is based in the village.
