= Królów Las =

Village in Pomeranian Voivodeship, Poland

- Village
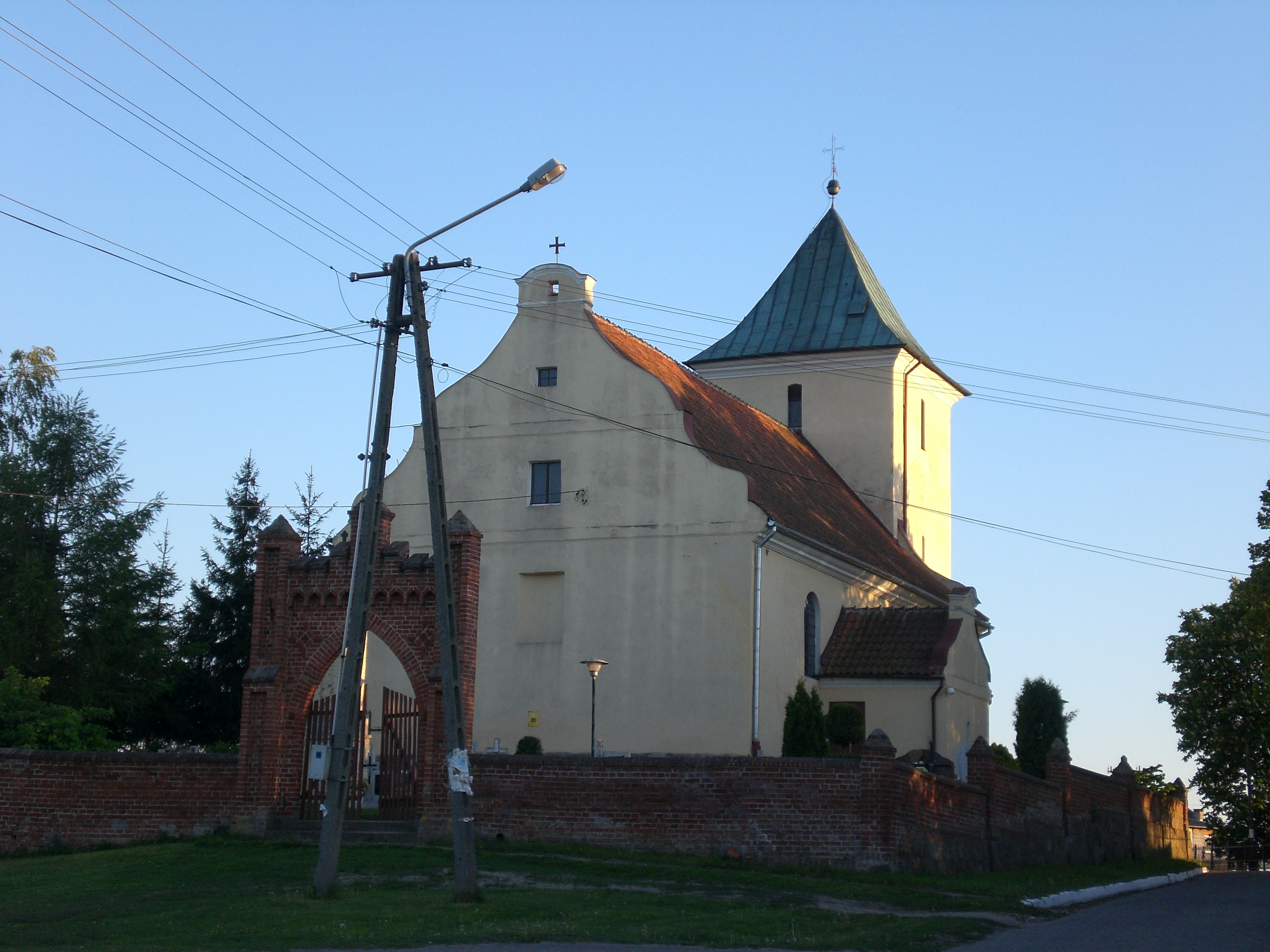
- The church of Saint Nicholas, 2009

- Location within Poland
- Coordinates: 53°48′43″N 18°41′58″E
- Country: Poland
- Voivodeship: Pomeranian
- County: Tczew
- Gmina: Morzeszczyn

Population (2022)
  - Total: 150
- Time zone: UTC+1 (CET)
  - Summer (DST): UTC+2 (CEST)
- Vehicle registration: GTC

Królów Las [ˈkruluf ˈlas] is a village in the administrative district of Gmina Morzeszczyn, within Tczew County, Pomeranian Voivodeship, in northern Poland. It is located within the ethnocultural region of Kociewie in the historical region of Pomerania.

== History ==
Królów Las was a private church village of the monastery in Pelplin, administratively located in the Tczew County in the Pomeranian Voivodeship of the Kingdom of Poland.

During the German occupation of Poland (World War II), in 1939, several Poles from Królów Las were among the victims of large massacres of Poles carried out by the Germans in the Szpęgawski Forest as part of the Intelligenzaktion.
