= Smętówko, Pomeranian Voivodeship =

Village in Pomeranian Voivodeship, Poland

Smętówko
- Village
- Location within Poland
- Coordinates: 53°43′58″N 18°39′59″E
- Country: Poland
- Voivodeship: Pomeranian
- County: Starogard
- Gmina: Smętowo Graniczne

Population (2023)
  - Total: 264
- Time zone: UTC+1 (CET)
  - Summer (DST): UTC+2 (CEST)
- Vehicle registration: GST

Smętówko [smɛnˈtufkɔ] is a village in the administrative district of Gmina Smętowo Graniczne, within Starogard County, Pomeranian Voivodeship, in northern Poland. It is located in the ethnocultural region of Kociewie in the historic region of Pomerania.
