= Gąsiorki =

Village in Pomeranian Voivodeship, Poland

- Village
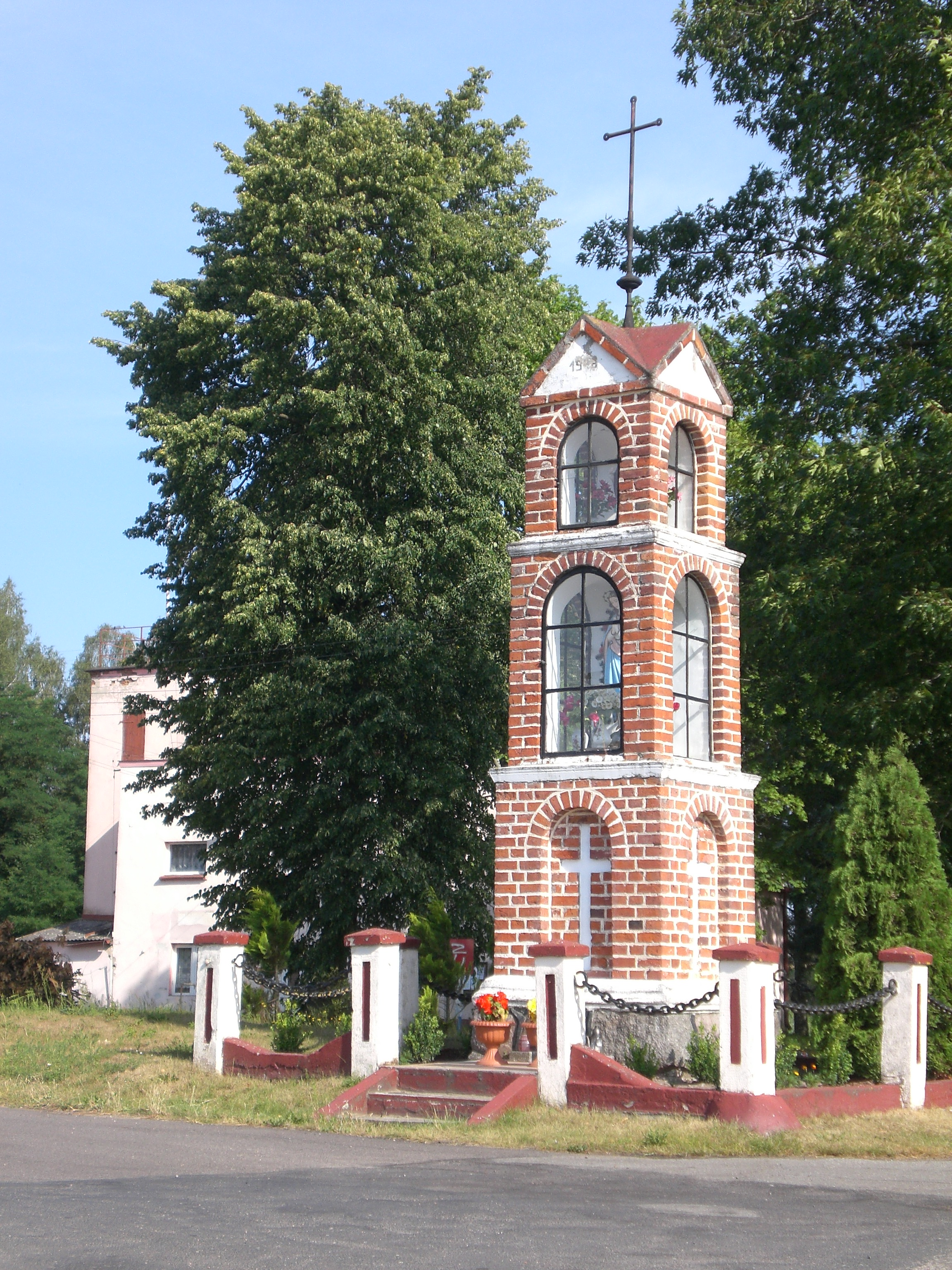
- A wayside shrine in Gąsiorki

- Location within Poland
- Coordinates: 53°48′37″N 18°38′58″E
- Country: Poland
- Voivodeship: Pomeranian
- County: Tczew
- Gmina: Morzeszczyn
- Population (2022): 185
- Time zone: UTC+1 (CET)
  - Summer (DST): UTC+2 (CEST)
- Vehicle registration: GTC

Gąsiorki [ɡɔ̃ˈɕɔrki] is a village in the administrative district of Gmina Morzeszczyn, within Tczew County, Pomeranian Voivodeship, in northern Poland. It is located in the ethnocultral region of Kociewie in the historic region of Pomerania.
