= Morzeszczyn railway station =

Railway station in Morzeszczyn, Poland

Morzeszczyn
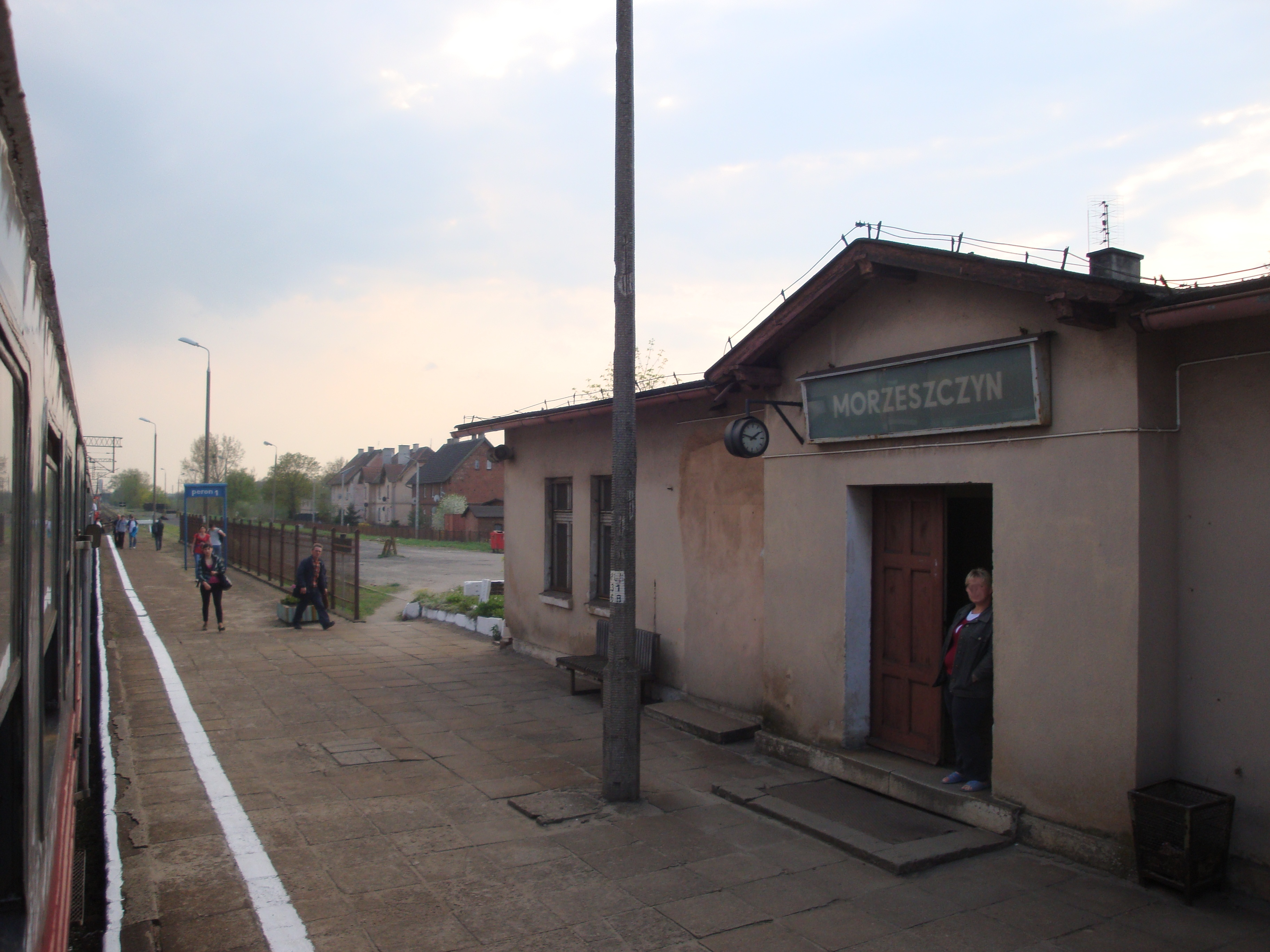
- View from a train window of the railway station building.

General information
- Location: Morzeszczyn; Poland
- Coordinates: 53.8370°N 18.6861°E
- Owner: Polskie Koleje Państwowe S.A.

Construction
- Structure type: Building: Depot: Water tower:

History
- Opened: 1852
- Former names: Morroschin until 1945
Location

Morzeszczyn is a PKP railway station in Morzeszczyn (Pomeranian Voivodeship), Poland. It was constructed in 1852 along the route of the Bydgoszcz - Tczew line which connected to the Prussian Eastern Railway.

Although a rail connection to the town of Gniew had initially been rejected, due to the town's maritime transport connections along the Vistula, by the early twentieth century a much needed rail connection was constructed via a branch line from Morzeszczyn. Opened in 1905, branch line 244 previously ran from Morzeszczyn, via to Brodzkie Młyny and Brody Pomorskie, to Gniew. The last passenger service on line 244 ran to Morzeszczyn on 10 July 1989, with freight services ending in 1992.
