= Brodzkie Młyny railway station =

Former railway station in Poland

Brodzkie Młyny
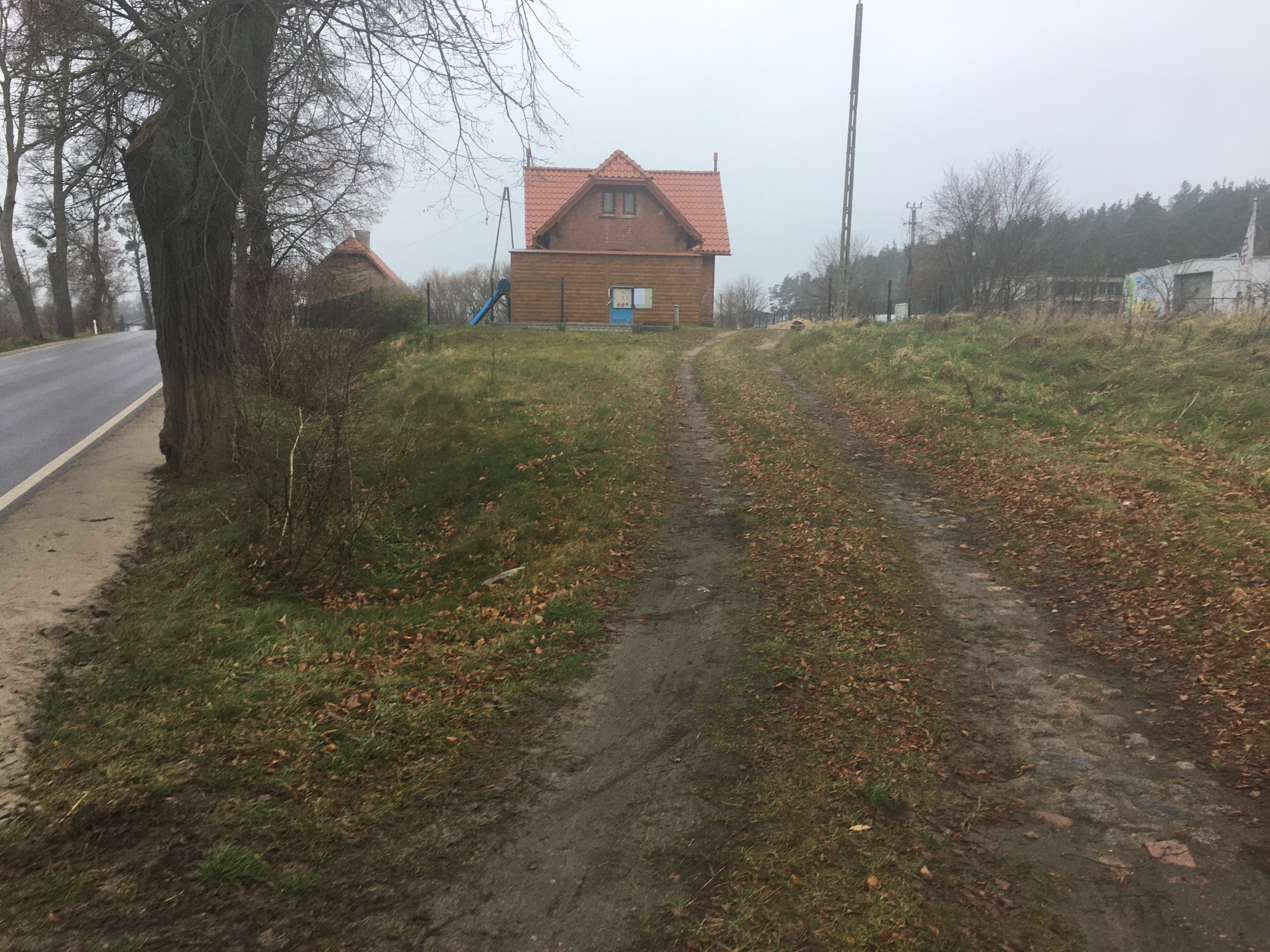
- View of the former Brodzkie Młyny station building.

General information
- Location: Brodzkie Młyny; Poland
- Coordinates: 53°50′23″N 18°47′20″E
- Owner: Polskie Koleje Państwowe S.A.
- Line: 244

Construction
- Structure type: Building: Residential housing

History
- Opened: 1905
- Former names: Broddener Mühle until 1945
Location

Brodzkie Młyny is a closed PKP railway station in Brodzkie Młyny (Pomeranian Voivodeship), Poland. Following the construction of the Prussian Eastern Railway residents of the nearby Gniew campaigned to have the town connected by branchline to Morzeszczyn, the resultant railway ran through Brodzkie Młyny.

The last passenger service ran through Brodzkie Młyny station on 10 July 1989.
