= Trivillage, Kociewie =

Rural settlement area in Kociewie

Trivillage Trójwieś
- Rural agglomeration
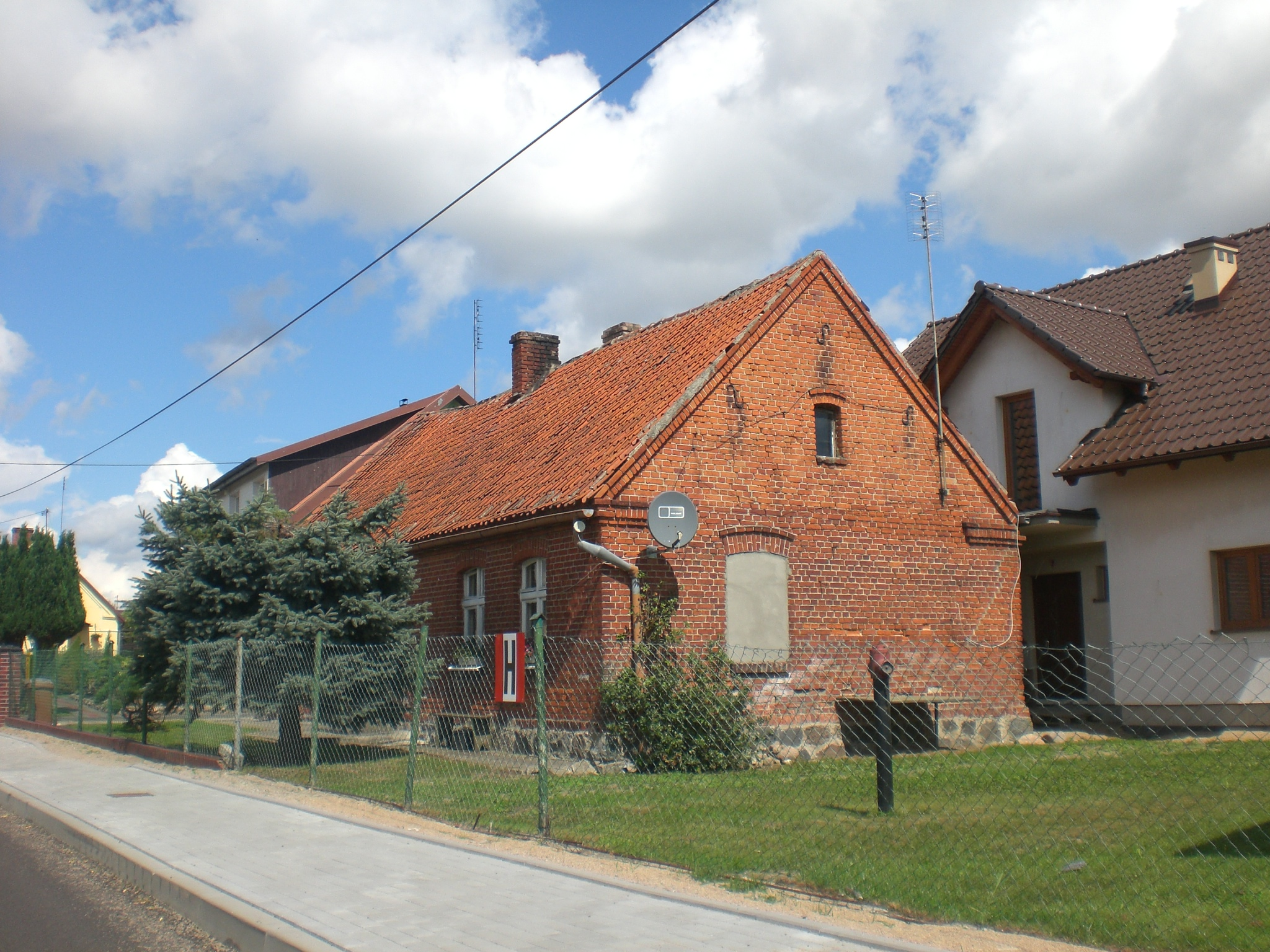
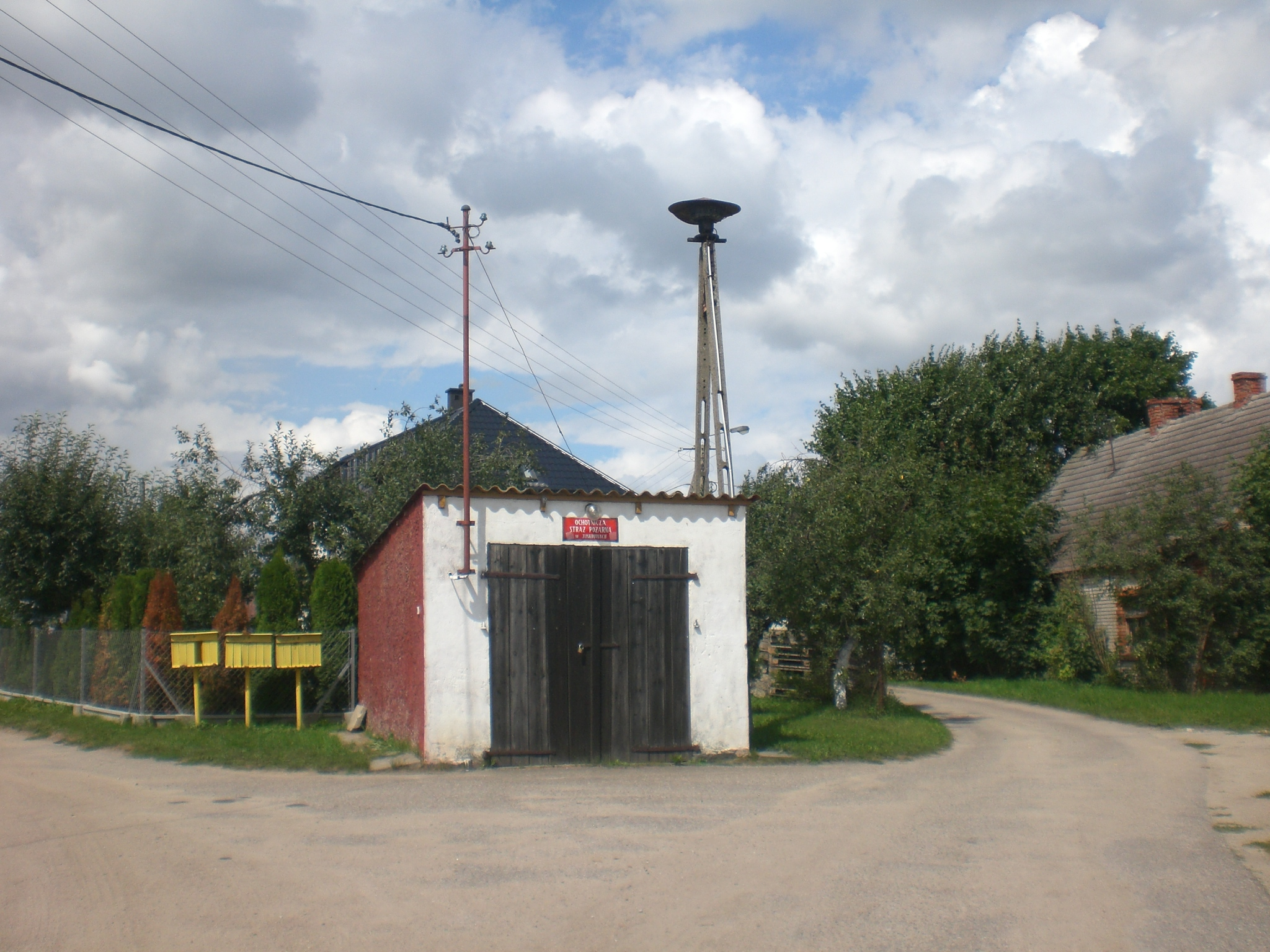
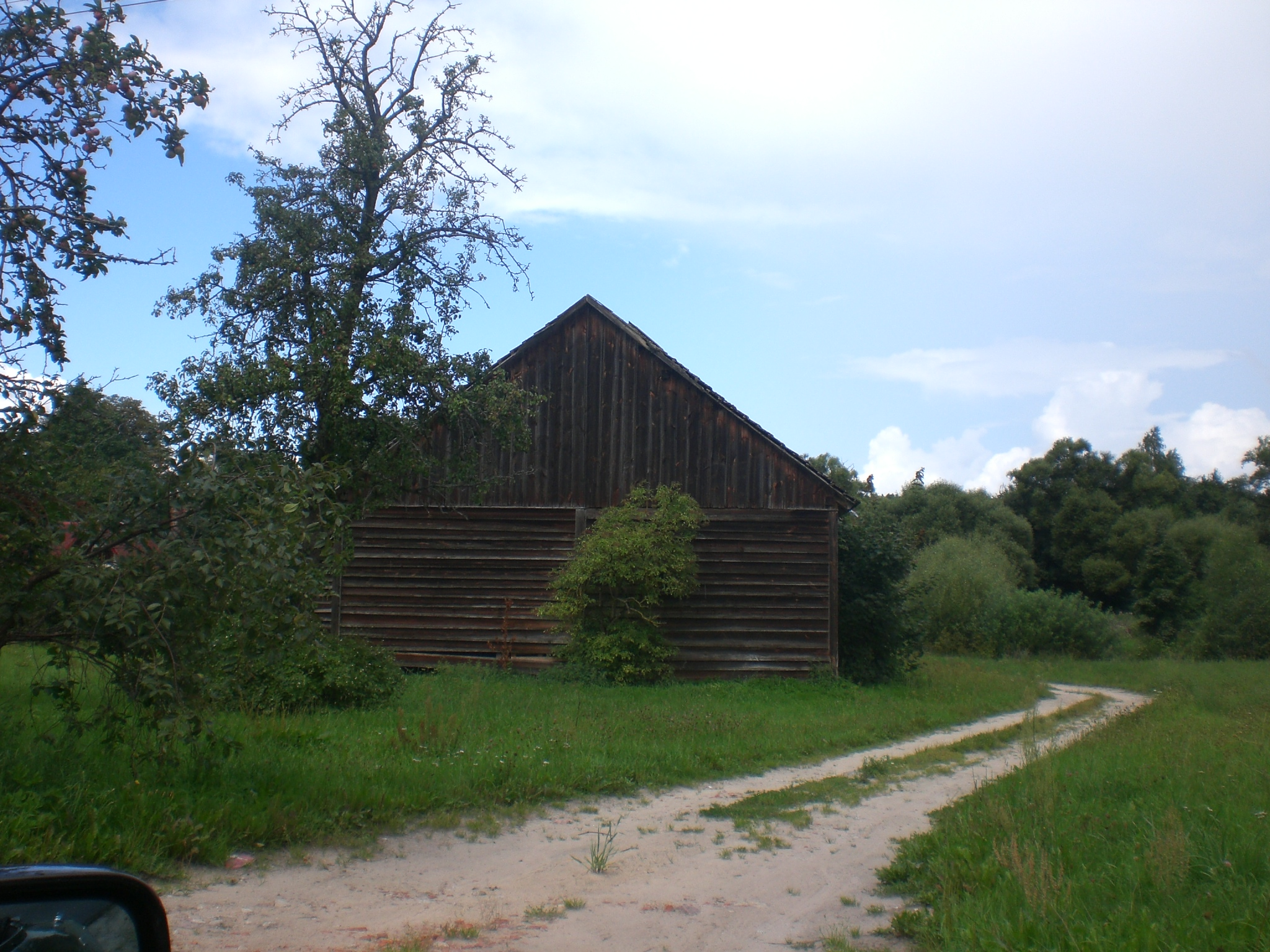
- Clockwise from top: housing in Więckowy, a timber-framed barn, and the Trivillage fire station
- Country: Poland
- Ethno-region: Kociewie
- Voivodeship: Pomeranian
- Powiat: Starogard
- Skarszewy: Gmina
- Established: 2014

Government
  - Type: Zarząd
  - Body: Stowarzyszenie "Trójwieś: Junkrowy - Więckowy - Malary"
  - Chair: Gabriella Plichta
  - Vice-Chair: Oskar Martin

Population
  - Total: 826

Trivillage (Polish: Trójwieś) is the name given to a rural area in the ethnocultural region of Kociewie, formed of the settlements of Junkrowy, Malary and Więckowy (including the hamlets of Zamkowa Góra and Probostwo). The moniker is used with reference to the urban conurbations of the Polish Tricity and Kashubian Tricity to the north of the region. Trivillage is formally represented by the Trivillage Association (Polish: Stowarzyszenie "Trójwieś"), a corporation founded in 2014, under the administration of Starogard County.

== Culture ==
In the early 21st century, the remains of a wooden mobile windmill, that had originally been built by a local resident in the 1930s, were discovered in the vicinity of the Trivillage. In 2015, the Trivillage Association funded the reconstruction of the mill as part of a local heritage project.

== Other settlements ==
The Trivillage moniker has also been used informally to refer to another settlement area in Kociewie comprising Kościelna Jania, Leśna Jania and Stara Jania. The grouping together of these villages is based on historic links, rather than for administrative purposes, as they were collectively owned by the voivode Jan z Jani in the 15th century.
