= Szczodrowo, Pomeranian Voivodeship =

Village in Pomeranian Voivodeship, Poland

Szczodrowo
- Village
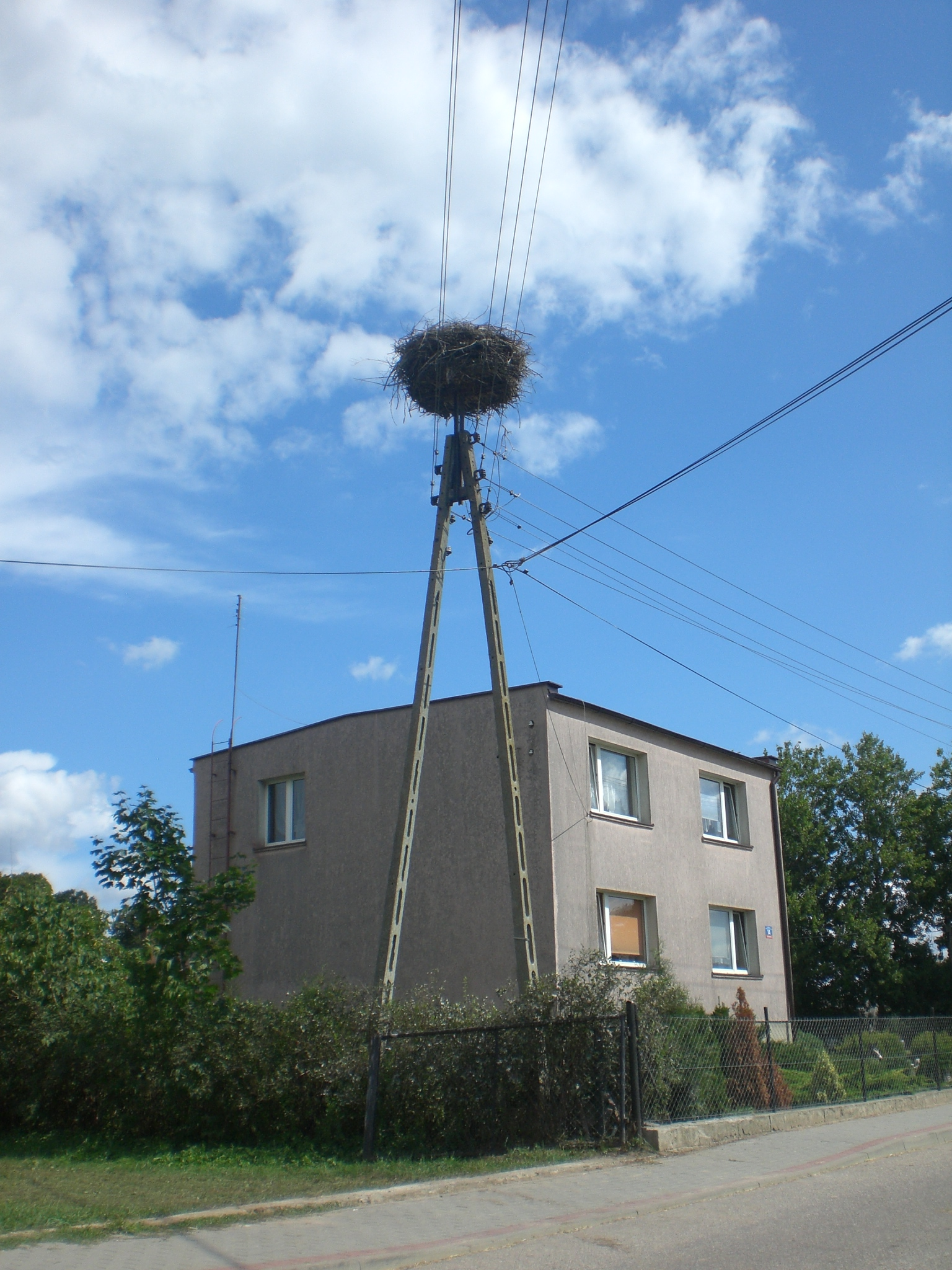

- Location within Poland
- Coordinates: 54°6′7″N 18°22′4″E
- Country: Poland
- Voivodeship: Pomeranian
- County: Starogard
- Gmina: Skarszewy
- Population: 382
- Time zone: UTC+1 (CET)
  - Summer (DST): UTC+2 (CEST)
- Vehicle registration: GST

Szczodrowo [ʂt͡ʂɔˈdrɔvɔ] is a village in the administrative district of Gmina Skarszewy, within Starogard County, Pomeranian Voivodeship, in northern Poland. It is located within the ethnocultural region of Kociewie in the historic region of Pomerania.

The settlement Przerębska Huta is part of the village.

== History ==
Szczodrowo was a royal village of the Kingdom of Poland, administratively located in the Tczew County in the Pomeranian Voivodeship.

During the occupation of Poland (World War II), many Poles from Szczodrowo were murdered by the Germans in 1939 in large massacres in the forest between Skarszewy and Więckowy.
