= Nygut =

Settlement in Pomeranian Voivodeship, Poland

- Hamlet
- Location within Poland
- Coordinates: 54°4′7″N 18°28′47″E
- Country: Poland
- Voivodeship: Pomeranian
- County: Starogard
- Gmina: Skarszewy
- Population: 28
- Time zone: UTC+1 (CET)
  - Summer (DST): UTC+2 (CEST)
- Vehicle registration: GST

Nygut [ˈnɨɡut] is a hamlet in the administrative district of Gmina Skarszewy, within Starogard County, Pomeranian Voivodeship, in northern Poland. Is it considered part of the village of Bolesławowo. It is located within the ethnocultural region of Kociewie in the historic region of Pomerania.

Nygut was a royal village of the Polish Crown, administratively located in the Tczew County in the Pomeranian Voivodeship.
