= Bożepole Królewskie =

Village in Pomeranian Voivodeship, Poland

- Village
- Location within Poland
- Coordinates: 54°6′57″N 18°25′8″E
- Country: Poland
- Voivodeship: Pomeranian
- County: Starogard
- Gmina: Skarszewy

Population
  - Total: 236
- Time zone: UTC+1 (CET)
  - Summer (DST): UTC+2 (CEST)
- Vehicle registration: GST

Bożepole Królewskie [bɔʐɛˈpɔlɛ kruˈlɛfskʲɛ] is a village in the administrative district of Gmina Skarszewy, within Starogard County, Pomeranian Voivodeship, in northern Poland. It is located within the ethnocultural region of Kociewie in the historic region of Pomerania.

== History ==
Bożepole was a royal village of the Polish Crown, administratively located in the Tczew County in the Pomeranian Voivodeship. It was annexed by Prussia in the First Partition of Poland in 1772, and restored to Poland, after Poland regained independence in 1918.

During the German occupation of Poland (World War II), the Germans murdered several Polish farmers from Bożepole in large massacres carried out in the forest near Skarszewy (see Nazi crimes against the Polish nation). In 1942 Germans carried out expulsions of Poles, whose farms were then handed over to German colonists as part of the Lebensraum policy.
