= Wilki (disambiguation) =

Wilki (meaning "wolves") is a rock band from Warsaw.

Wilki may also refer to the following villages:

- Wilki, Pomeranian Voivodeship (north Poland)
- Wilki, Warmian-Masurian Voivodeship (north-east Poland)
