= Koźmin, Pomeranian Voivodeship =

Village in Pomeranian Voivodeship, Poland

Koźmin
- Village
- Location within Poland
- Coordinates: 54°0′28″N 18°18′21″E
- Country: Poland
- Voivodeship: Pomeranian
- County: Starogard
- Gmina: Skarszewy
- Population: 468
- Time zone: UTC+1 (CET)
  - Summer (DST): UTC+2 (CEST)
- Vehicle registration: GST

Koźmin [ˈkɔʑmin] is a village in the administrative district of Gmina Skarszewy, within Starogard County, Pomeranian Voivodeship, in northern Poland. It is located within the ethnocultural region of Kociewie in the historic region of Pomerania.

== History ==
Koźmin was a private church village of the monastery in Pelplin, administratively located in the Tczew County in the Pomeranian Voivodeship of the Kingdom of Poland.

During the German occupation of Poland (World War II), in 1941–1942, the occupiers carried out expulsions of Poles, who were sent to the Potulice concentration camp, and then deported either to forced labour in Germany or to the General Government (German-occupied central Poland), while their farms were then handed over to German colonists as part of the Lebensraum policy.
