= Czarnocin, Pomeranian Voivodeship =

Village in Pomeranian Voivodeship, Poland

Czarnocin
- Village
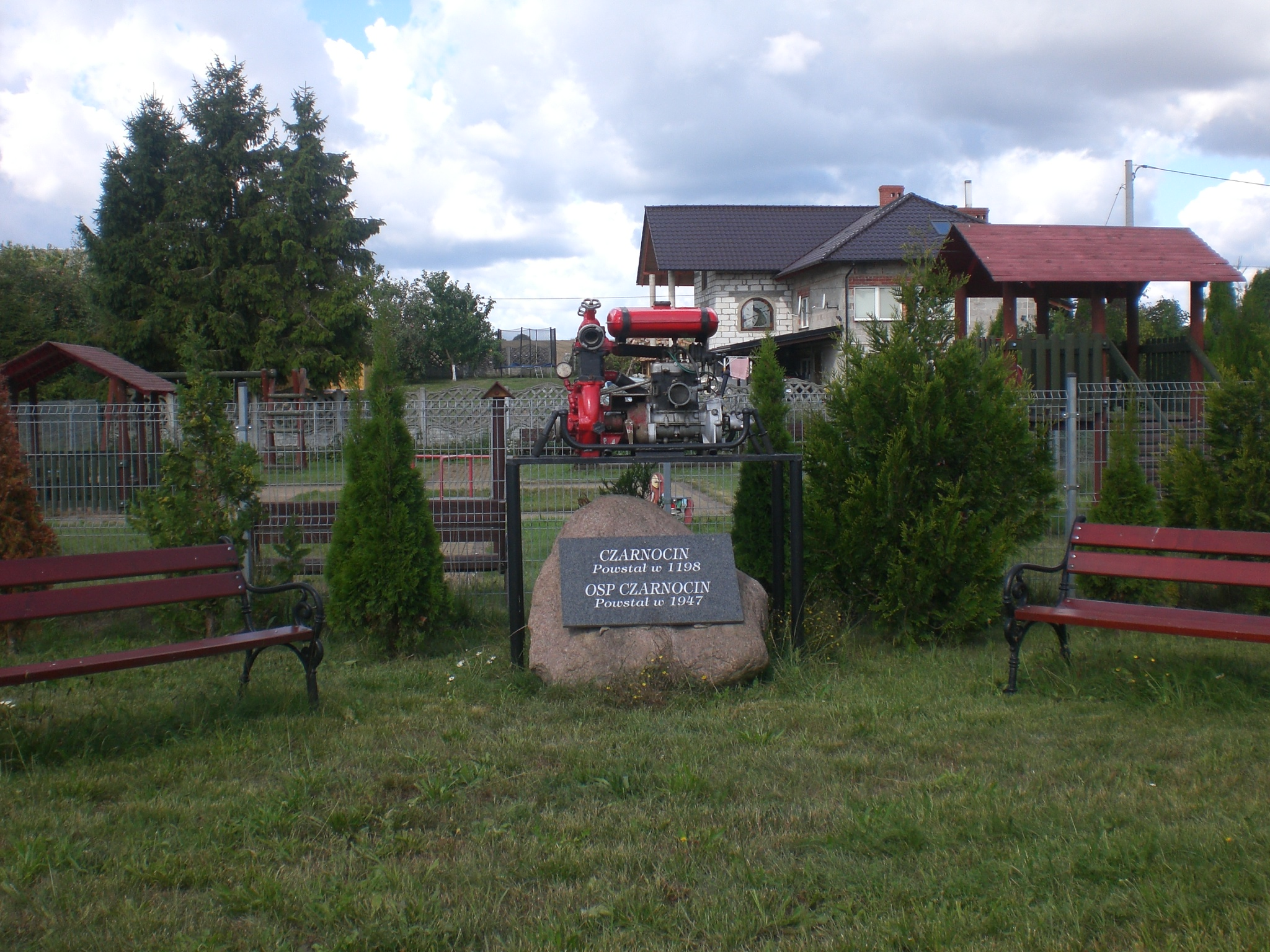
- Commemorative stone to the foundation of Czarnocin in 1198, and the establishment of the village's OSP in 1947

- Location within Poland
- Coordinates: 54°2′8″N 18°25′14″E
- Country: Poland
- Voivodeship: Pomeranian
- County: Starogard
- Gmina: Skarszewy
- Population: 204
- Time zone: UTC+1 (CET)
  - Summer (DST): UTC+2 (CEST)
- Vehicle registration: GST

Czarnocin [t͡ʂarˈnɔt͡ɕin] is a village in the administrative district of Gmina Skarszewy, within Starogard County, Pomeranian Voivodeship, in northern Poland. It is located within the ethnocultural region of Kociewie in the historic region of Pomerania.

== History ==
Czarnocin was a royal village of the Polish Crown, administratively located in the Tczew County in the Pomeranian Voivodeship. It was annexed by Prussia in the First Partition of Poland in 1772, and restored to Poland, after Poland regained independence in 1918.
