= Jastrzębce, Pomeranian Voivodeship =

Hamlet in Pomeranian Voivodeship, Poland

Jastrzębce
- Hamlet
- Location within Poland
- Coordinates: 54°02′44″N 18°19′35″E
- Country: Poland
- Voivodeship: Pomeranian
- County: Starogard
- Gmina: Skarszewy
- Population: 3
- Time zone: UTC+1 (CET)
  - Summer (DST): UTC+2 (CEST)
- Vehicle registration: GST

Jastrzębce [jasˈtʂɛmpt͡sɛ] is a hamlet in the administrative district of Gmina Skarszewy, within Starogard County, Pomeranian Voivodeship, in northern Poland. It is located within the ethnocultural region of Kociewie in the historic region of Pomerania.
