= Godziszewo, Pomeranian Voivodeship =

Village in Pomeranian Voivodeship, Poland

Godziszewo
- Village
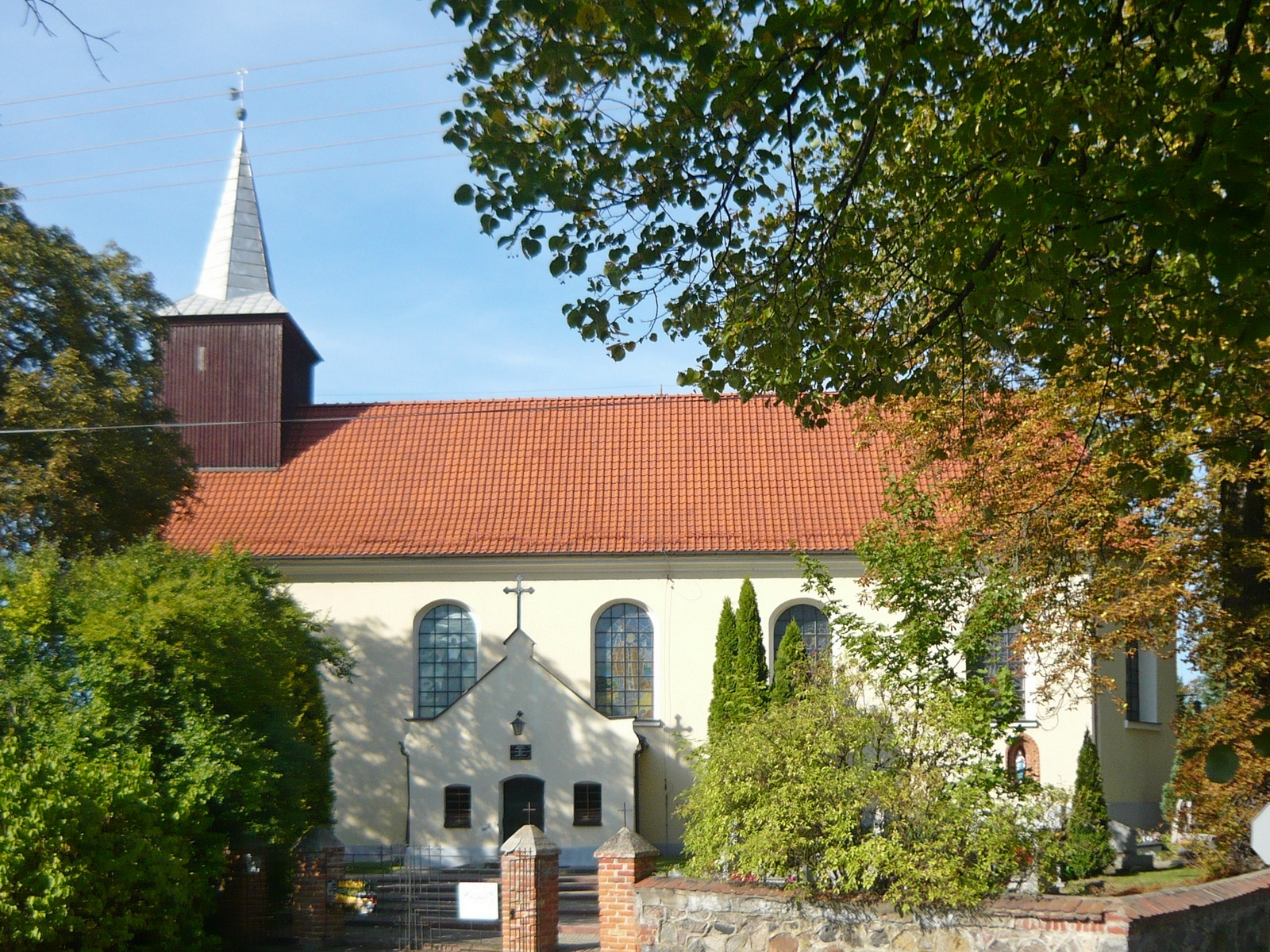
- Saint John of Nepomuk Church

- Location within Poland
- Coordinates: 54°5′55″N 18°33′20″E
- Country: Poland
- Voivodeship: Pomeranian
- County: Starogard
- Gmina: Skarszewy
- Population: 641
- Time zone: UTC+1 (CET)
  - Summer (DST): UTC+2 (CEST)
- Vehicle registration: GST

Godziszewo [ɡɔd͡ʑiˈʂɛvɔ] is a village in the administrative district of Gmina Skarszewy, within Starogard County, Pomeranian Voivodeship, in northern Poland. It is located within the ethnocultural region of Kociewie in the historic region of Pomerania.
