= Karl-Heinz Prudöhl =

East German rower

Personal information
- Born: 3 December 1944 (age 81) Eberhardsdorf, Poland
- Height: 185 cm (6 ft 1 in)
- Weight: 89 kg (196 lb)

Sport
- Sport: Rowing
Medal record
Men's rowing
Representing East Germany
Olympic Games
| Gold medal – first place | 1976 Montreal | Eight |
World Rowing Championships
| Silver medal – second place | 1970 St. Catharines | Coxed four |
| Gold medal – first place | 1975 Nottingham | Eight |
European Rowing Championships
| Bronze medal – third place | 1969 Klagenfurt | Coxless four |
| Gold medal – first place | 1973 Moscow | Eight |

Karl-Heinz Prudöhl (born 3 December 1944) is a German rower who competed for East Germany in the 1976 Summer Olympics.

He was born in Eberhardsdorf, German-occupied Poland. In 1976, he was a crew member of the East German boat, which won the gold medal in the eight event.
