= Bączek, Pomeranian Voivodeship =

Village in Pomeranian Voivodeship, Poland

Bączek
- Village
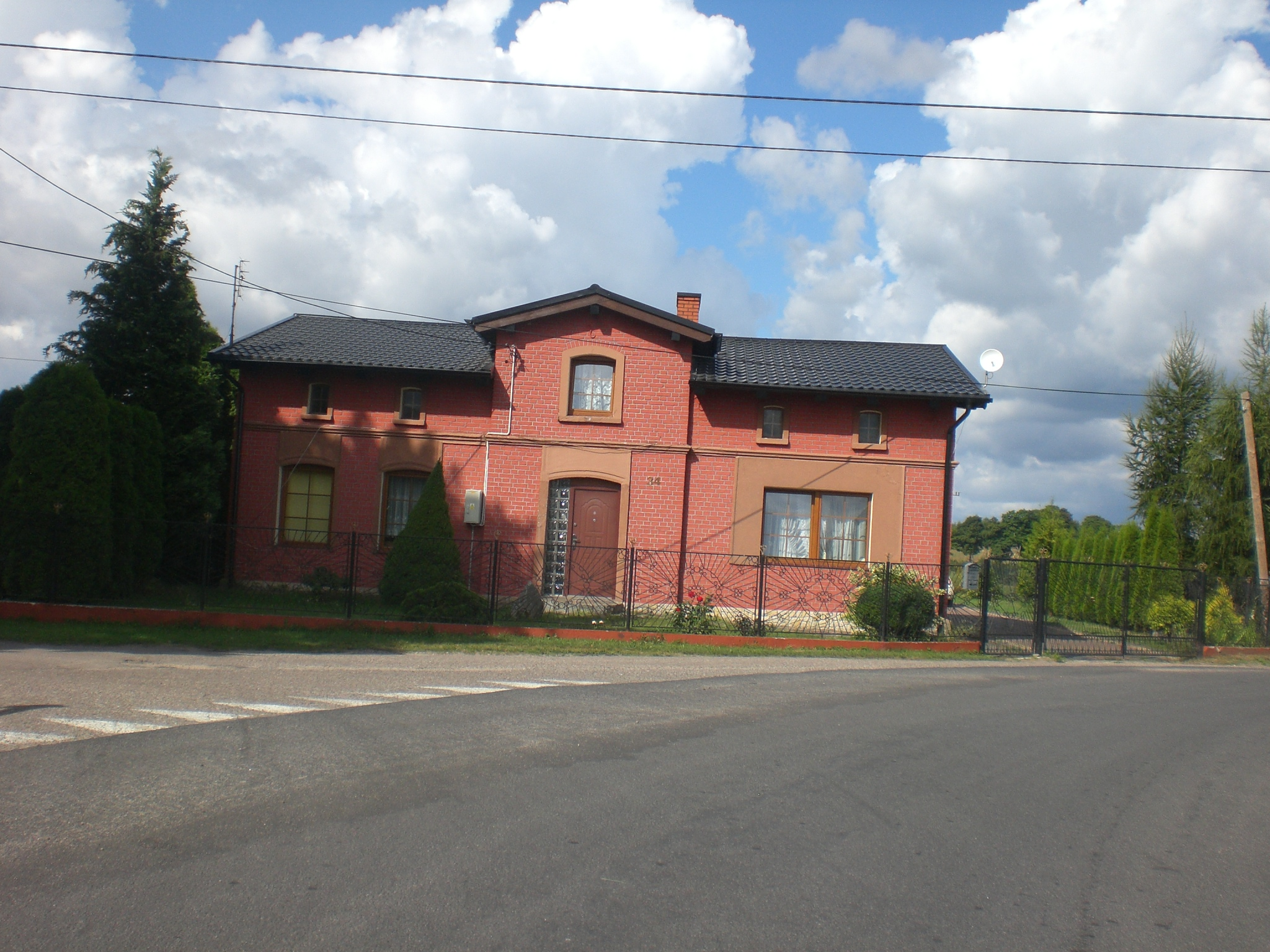

- Location within Poland
- Coordinates: 54°1′48″N 18°27′52″E
- Country: Poland
- Voivodeship: Pomeranian
- County: Starogard
- Gmina: Skarszewy

Population
  - Total: 406
- Time zone: UTC+1 (CET)
  - Summer (DST): UTC+2 (CEST)

Bączek [ˈbɔnt͡ʂɛk] is a village in the administrative district of Gmina Skarszewy, within Starogard County, Pomeranian Voivodeship, in northern Poland. It is located in the ethnocultural region of Kociewie in the historic region of Pomerania.

== History ==
Three Polish citizens were murdered by Nazi Germany in the village during World War II.
