= Marianka, Pomeranian Voivodeship =

Settlement in Pomeranian Voivodeship, Poland

Marianka
- Colony
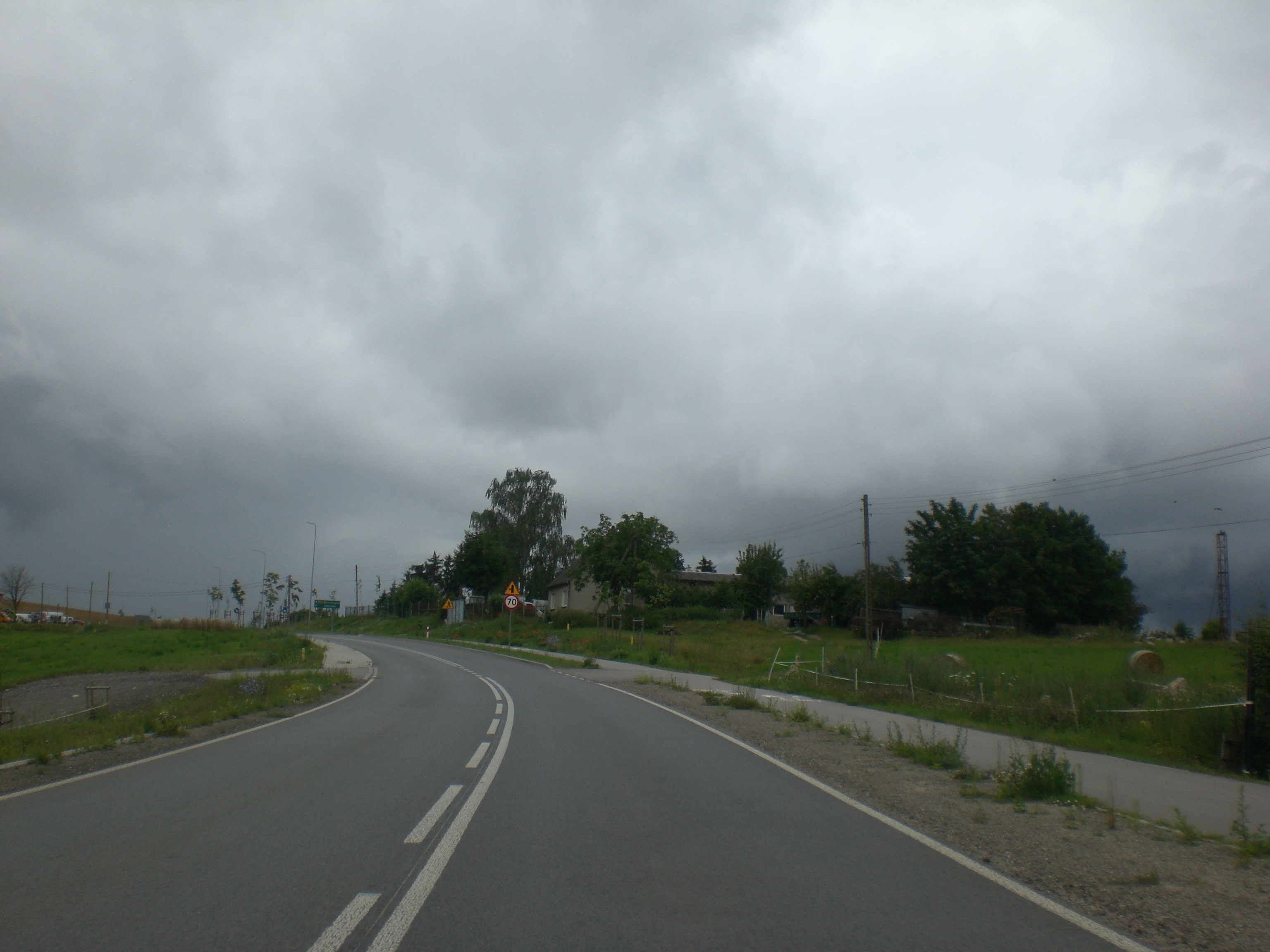

- Location within Poland
- Coordinates: 54°5′44″N 18°34′53″E
- Country: Poland
- Voivodeship: Pomeranian
- County: Starogard
- Gmina: Skarszewy

Population
  - Total: 64
- Time zone: UTC+1 (CET)
  - Summer (DST): UTC+2 (CEST)
- Vehicle registration: GST

Marianka [maˈrjanka] is a colony in the administrative district of Gmina Skarszewy, within Starogard County, Pomeranian Voivodeship, in northern Poland. It is located within the ethnocultural region of Kociewie in the historic region of Pomerania.
