= Jastrzębie Skarszewskie =

Hamlet in Pomeranian Voivodeship, Poland

- Hamlet
- Location within Poland
- Coordinates: 54°3′4″N 18°30′34″E
- Country: Poland
- Voivodeship: Pomeranian
- County: Starogard
- Gmina: Skarszewy
- Population: 18
- Time zone: UTC+1 (CET)
  - Summer (DST): UTC+2 (CEST)
- Vehicle registration: GST

Jastrzębie Skarszewskie [jasˈtʂɛmbjɛ skarˈʂɛfskʲɛ] is a hamlet in the administrative district of Gmina Skarszewy, within Starogard County, Pomeranian Voivodeship, in northern Poland. It is located within the ethnocultural region of Kociewie in the historic region of Pomerania.
