= Kamierowskie Piece =

Village in Pomeranian Voivodeship, Poland

- Village
- Location within Poland
- Coordinates: 54°6′16″N 18°27′25″E
- Country: Poland
- Voivodeship: Pomeranian
- County: Starogard
- Gmina: Skarszewy
- Population: 192
- Time zone: UTC+1 (CET)
  - Summer (DST): UTC+2 (CEST)
- Vehicle registration: GST

Kamierowskie Piece [kamjɛˈrɔfskʲɛ ˈpjɛt͡sɛ] is a village in the administrative district of Gmina Skarszewy, within Starogard County, Pomeranian Voivodeship, in northern Poland. It is located within the ethnocultural region of Kociewie in the historic region of Pomerania.
