= Nowy Wiec =

Village in Pomeranian Voivodeship, Poland

- Village
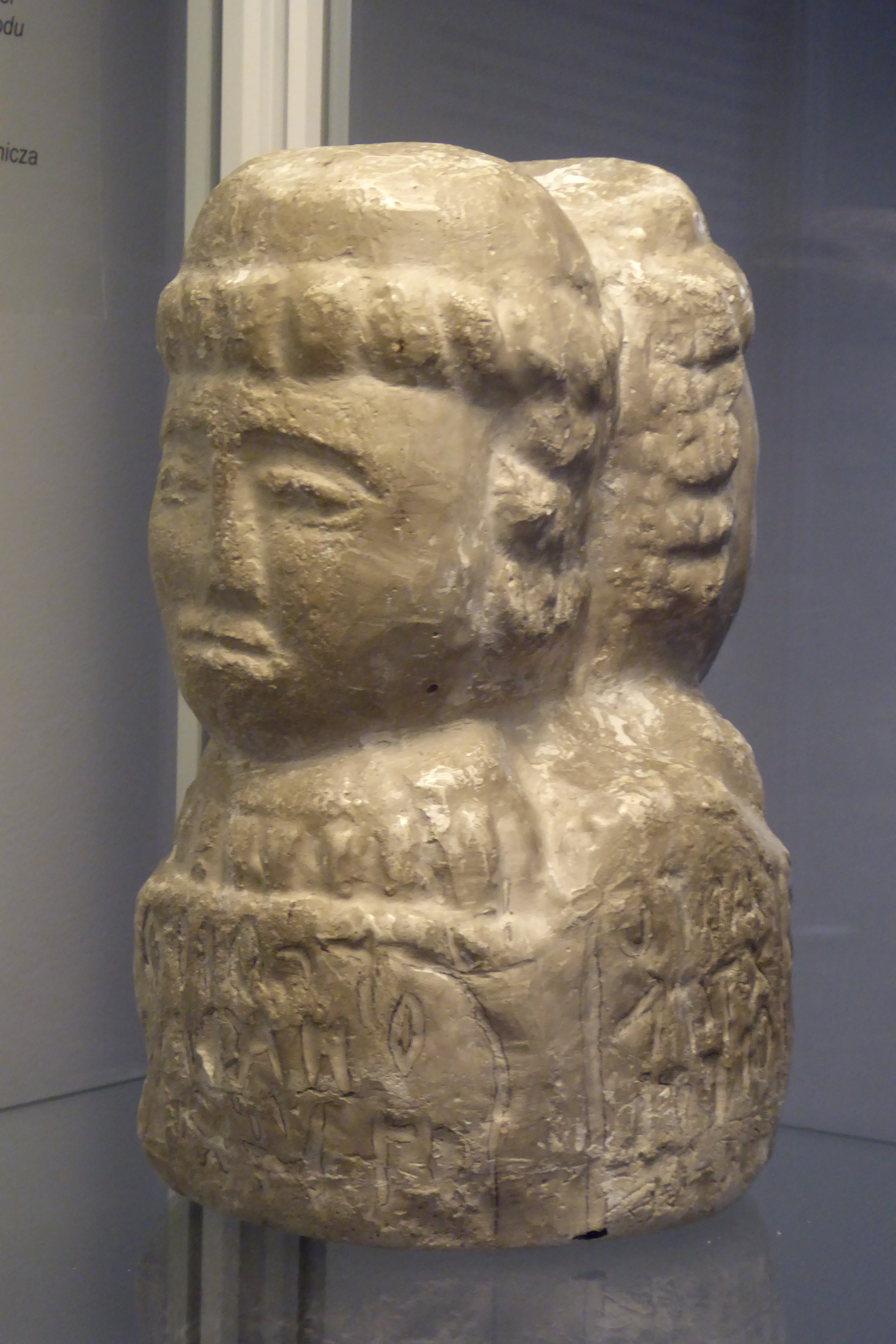
- A plaster copy of a bust of Svarozhits unearthed in the village, on display in the Museum of Archæology in Gdańsk

- Location within Poland
- Coordinates: 54°7′34″N 18°20′57″E
- Country: Poland
- Voivodeship: Pomeranian
- County: Starogard
- Gmina: Skarszewy
- Population: 373
- Time zone: UTC+1 (CET)
  - Summer (DST): UTC+2 (CEST)
- Vehicle registration: GST

Nowy Wiec [ˈnɔvɨ ˈvjɛt͡s] is a village in the administrative district of Gmina Skarszewy, within Starogard County, Pomeranian Voivodeship, in northern Poland. It is located within the ethnocultural region of Kociewie in the historic region of Pomerania.

== Archæology ==
In 1920, archæologists discovered a granite bust of a double-headed figure in the vicinity of the village. The find is believed to be a statue of the Slavic god Svarozhits. The statue was stolen from a museum in Toruń during World War II.
