= Zapowiednik, Pomeranian Voivodeship =

Settlement in Pomeranian Voivodeship, Poland

Zapowiednik
- Hamlet
- Location within Poland
- Coordinates: 54°2′27″N 18°28′26″E
- Country: Poland
- Voivodeship: Pomeranian
- County: Starogard
- Gmina: Skarszewy

Population
  - Total: 7
- Time zone: UTC+1 (CET)
  - Summer (DST): UTC+2 (CEST)
- Vehicle registration: GST

Zapowiednik [zapɔˈvjɛdnik] is a hamlet in the administrative district of Gmina Skarszewy, within Starogard County, Pomeranian Voivodeship, in northern Poland. It is located in the ethnocultural region of Kociewie in the historic region of Pomerania.
