= Pogódki =

Village in Pomeranian Voivodeship, Poland

- Village
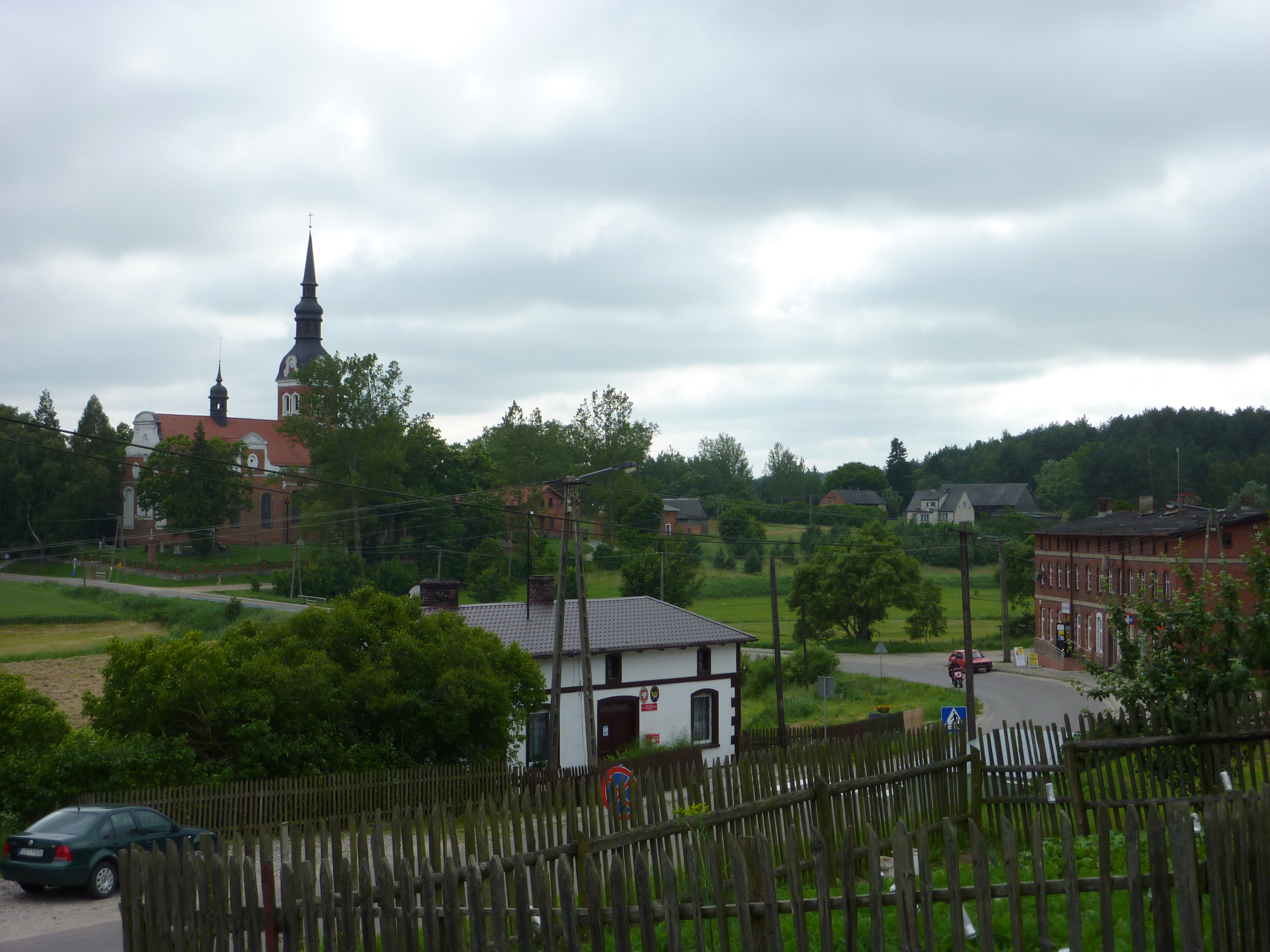
- View of the village with the Baroque church in the background

- Location within Poland
- Coordinates: 54°1′33″N 18°19′12″E
- Country: Poland
- Voivodeship: Pomeranian
- County: Starogard
- Gmina: Skarszewy
- First mentioned: 1198
- Population: 797
- Time zone: UTC+1 (CET)
  - Summer (DST): UTC+2 (CEST)
- Vehicle registration: GST

Pogódki [pɔˈɡutki] is a village in the administrative district of Gmina Skarszewy, within Starogard County, Pomeranian Voivodeship, in northern Poland. It is located within the ethnocultural region of Kociewie in the historic region of Pomerania.

== History ==
Pogódki dates back to medieval Poland. The oldest known mention of the village comes from 1198. In 1258, a Cistercian monastery was founded by Duke Sambor II, which was eventually moved to Pelplin in 1276. Later on, Pogódki was a private church village of the monastery in Pelplin, administratively located in the Tczew County in the Pomeranian Voivodeship of the Kingdom of Poland.

During the German occupation of Poland (World War II), Pogódki was one of the sites of executions of Poles, carried out by the Germans in 1939 as part of the Intelligenzaktion. In 1942, the occupiers carried out expulsions of Poles, who were sent to the Potulice concentration camp, and then deported either to forced labour in Germany or to the General Government (German-occupied central Poland), while their farms were then handed over to German colonists as part of the Lebensraum policy.
