= Jaroszewy =

Village in Pomeranian Voivodeship, Poland

- Village
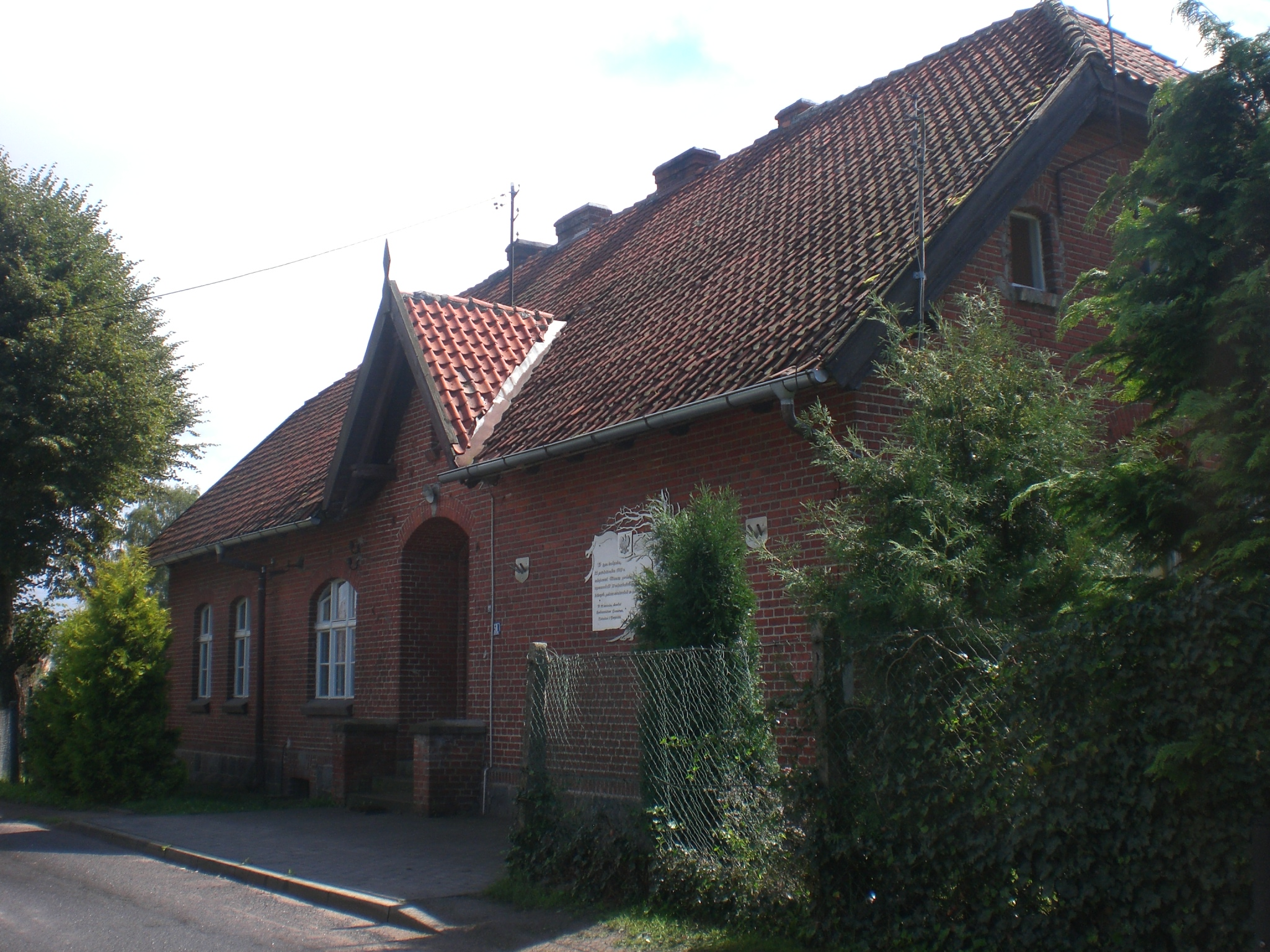

- Location within Poland
- Coordinates: 54°1′44″N 18°21′30″E
- Country: Poland
- Voivodeship: Pomeranian
- County: Starogard
- Gmina: Skarszewy
- Population: 464
- Time zone: UTC+1 (CET)
  - Summer (DST): UTC+2 (CEST)
- Vehicle registration: GST

Jaroszewy [jarɔˈʂɛvɨ] is a village in the administrative district of Gmina Skarszewy, within Starogard County, Pomeranian Voivodeship, in northern Poland. It is located within the ethnocultural region of Kociewie in the historic region of Pomerania.

== History ==
Jaroszewy was a private church village within the Polish Crown, administratively located in the Tczew County in the Pomeranian Voivodeship, owned by the monastery in Pelplin.

During the German occupation of Poland (World War II), in October 1939, the Germans deceitfully ordered a formal meeting for local Polish farmers at a local school. 46 farmers were then arrested and transported to the nearby village of Mestwinowo and murdered there by the SS and Selbstschutz. In November 1939, the Germans expelled 76 Poles from the village. The farms of expelled Poles were then handed over to Germans as part of the Lebensraum policy. In 1942, the occupiers changed the name to Eberhardsdorf to erase traces of Polish origin. German occupation ended in 1945, and the historic name of the village was restored.

== Notable residents ==
- Karl-Heinz Prudöhl (born 1944), German rower
