= Barka, Pomeranian Voivodeship =

Village in Pomeranian Voivodeship, Poland

Barka
- Settlement
- Location within Poland
- Coordinates: 54°2′12″N 18°24′18″E
- Country: Poland
- Voivodeship: Pomeranian
- County: Starogard
- Gmina: Skarszewy

Population
  - Total: 7
- Time zone: UTC+1 (CET)
  - Summer (DST): UTC+2 (CEST)
- Vehicle registration: GST

Barka [ˈbarka] is a settlement in the administrative district of Gmina Skarszewy, within Starogard County, Pomeranian Voivodeship, in northern Poland. It is located in the ethnocultural region of Kociewie in the historic region of Pomerania.
