= Trzcianka, Pomeranian Voivodeship =

Settlement in Pomeranian Voivodeship, Poland

Trzcianka
- Hamlet
- Location within Poland
- Coordinates: 54°7′4″N 18°27′24″E
- Country: Poland
- Voivodeship: Pomeranian
- County: Starogard
- Gmina: Skarszewy

Population
  - Total: 34
- Time zone: UTC+1 (CET)
  - Summer (DST): UTC+2 (CEST)
- Vehicle registration: GST

Trzcianka [ˈtʂt͡ɕanka] is a hamlet in the administrative district of Gmina Skarszewy, within Starogard County, Pomeranian Voivodeship, in northern Poland. It is located in the ethnocultural region of Kociewie in the historic region of Pomerania.
