= Bartłomiej Smuczyński =

Polish footballer

Personal information
- Date of birth: 25 August 1995 (age 31)
- Place of birth: Skarszewy, Poland
- Height: 1.75 m (5 ft 9 in)
- Position: Winger

Team information
- Current team: Wietcisa Skarszewy
- Number: 18

Youth career
- KS Beniaminek 03
- Lechia Gdańsk

Senior career*
Years	Team	Apps	(Gls)
2013–2015	Lechia Gdańsk	1	(0)
2014	→ Kolejarz Stróże (loan)	15	(4)
2014–2015	→ Bruk-Bet Termalica (loan)	12	(2)
2015–2018	Bruk-Bet Termalica	17	(1)
2018–2019	KSZO Ostrowiec	51	(12)
2020	Wieczysta Kraków	0	(0)
2020–2021	Broń Radom	16	(1)
2021	KSZO Ostrowiec	16	(2)
2022–	Wietcisa Skarszewy	60	(41)
- * Club domestic league appearances and goals as of 00:11, 27 August 2024 (UTC)

Bartłomiej Smuczyński (born 25 August 1995) is a Polish professional footballer who plays as a winger for Wietcisa Skarszewy.

== Career ==
In January 2020, Smuczyński moved to regional league club Wieczysta Kraków.

== Honours ==
KSZO Ostrowiec Świętokrzyski

- Polish Cup (Świętokrzyskie regionals): 2018–19, 2020–21
