= Junkrowy =

Village in Pomeranian Voivodeship, Poland

- Village
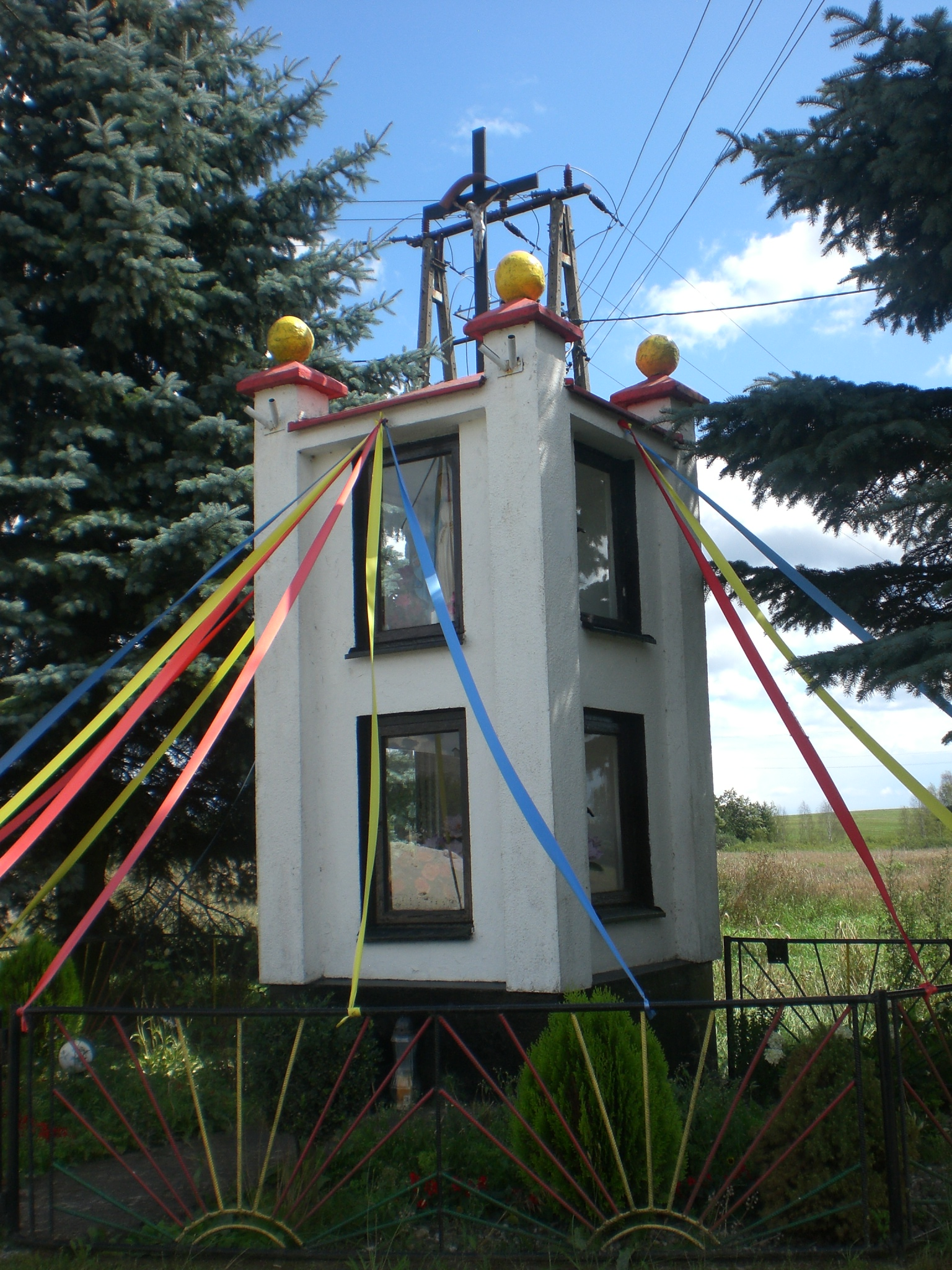
- Wayside shrine in Junkrowy

- Location within Poland
- Coordinates: 54°4′25″N 18°21′43″E
- Country: Poland
- Voivodeship: Pomeranian
- County: Starogard
- Gmina: Skarszewy
- Population: 100
- Time zone: UTC+1 (CET)
  - Summer (DST): UTC+2 (CEST)
- Vehicle registration: GST

Junkrowy [junˈkrɔvɨ] is a village in the administrative district of Gmina Skarszewy, within Starogard County, Pomeranian Voivodeship, in northern Poland. It is located within the ethnocultural region of Kociewie in the historic region of Pomerania.

== History ==
Junkrowy dates back to the medieval Poland. In the 13th century, it was granted to the Cistercian monastery in Pelplin by Duke Sambor II. Within the Kingdom of Poland, Junkrowy was a private church village of the Pelplin Abbey, administratively located in the Tczew County in the Pomeranian Voivodeship.

During the German occupation of Poland (World War II), in 1942, the occupiers carried out expulsions of Poles, whose farms were handed over to German colonists in accordance with the Lebensraum policy.
