= Wilki, Pomeranian Voivodeship =

Settlement in Poland

Wilki
- Hamlet
- Location within Poland
- Coordinates: 54°5′21″N 18°23′59″E
- Country: Poland
- Voivodeship: Pomeranian
- County: Starogard
- Gmina: Skarszewy

Population
  - Total: 17
- Postal code: 83-250

Wilki [ˈvilki] is a hamlet in the administrative district of Gmina Skarszewy, within Starogard County, Pomeranian Voivodeship, in northern Poland. It is located in the region of Kociewie in the larger historic region of Pomerania.
