= Gmina Skarszewy =

Gmina Skarszewy Skarszewy Commune
- Gmina
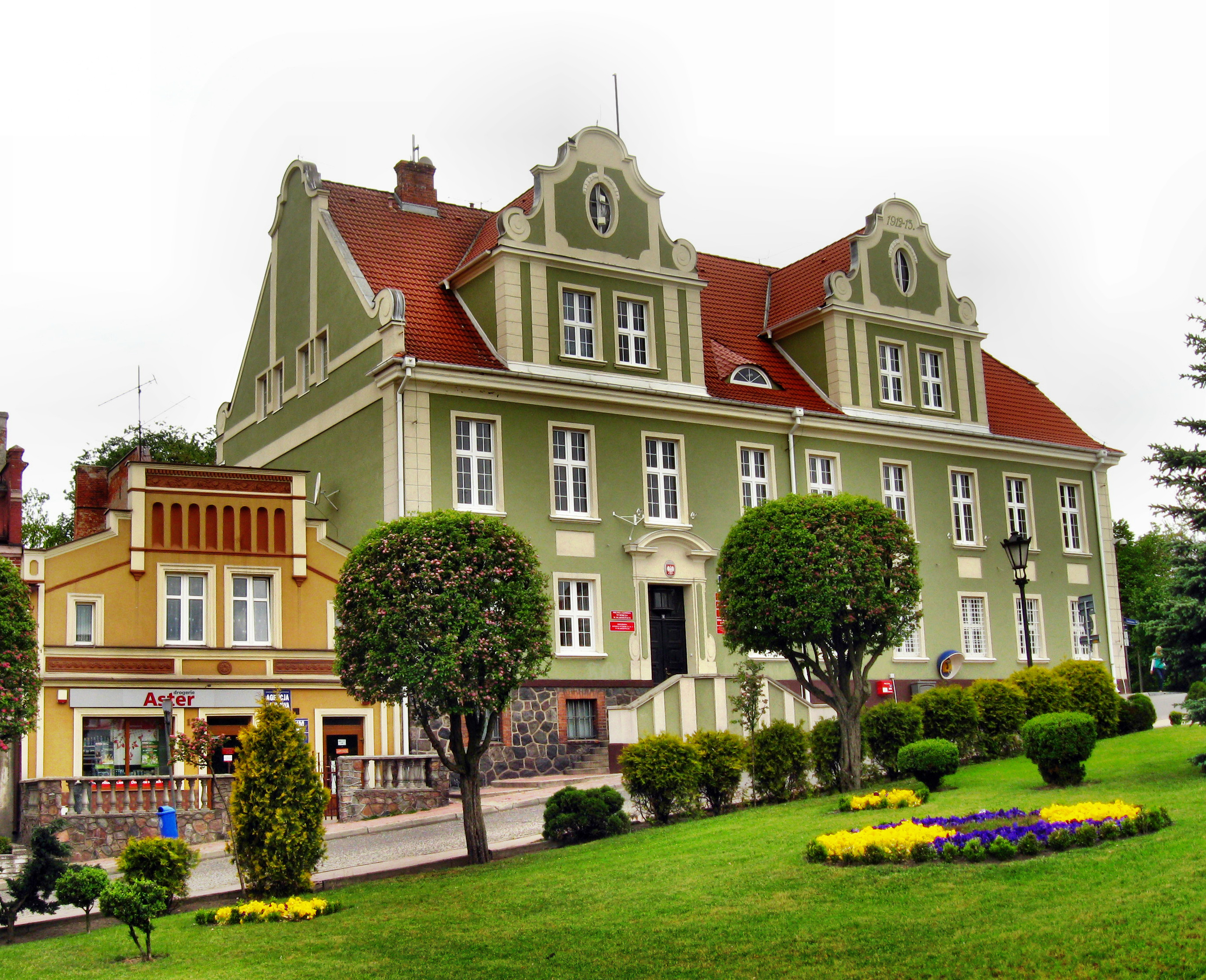
- Town Hall in Skarszewy, seat of the gmina office

- Coat of arms
- Interactive map of Gmina Skarszewy
- Coordinates (Skarszewy): 54°4′2″N 18°26′45″E
- Country: Poland
- Voivodeship: Pomeranian
- County: Starogard
- Seat: Skarszewy

Area
  - Total: 169.79 km^{2} (65.56 sq mi)

Population (2023)
  - Total: 14,412
  - Density: 84.881/km^{2} (219.84/sq mi)
  - Urban: 6,568
  - Rural: 7,944
- Time zone: UTC+1 (CET)
  - Summer (DST): UTC+2 (CEST)
- Website: http://www.skarszewy.pl

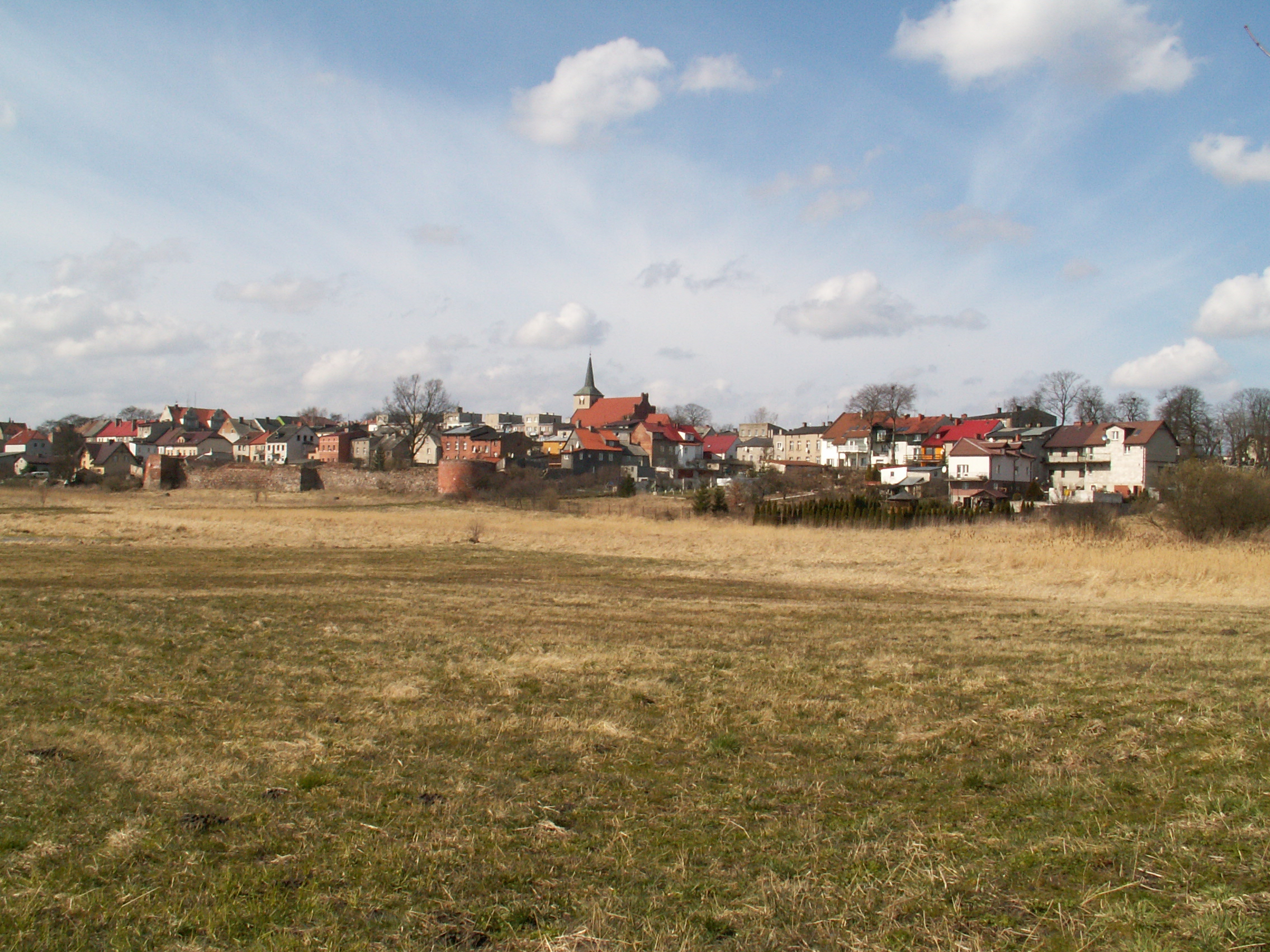
Gmina Skarszewy

Gmina Skarszewy is an urban-rural gmina (administrative district) in Starogard County, Pomeranian Voivodeship, in northern Poland. Its seat is the town of Skarszewy, which lies approximately 13 kilometres (8 mi) north-west of Starogard Gdański and 36 km (22 mi) south of the regional capital Gdańsk.

The gmina covers an area of 169.79 square kilometres (65.6 sq mi), and as of 2023 its total population is 14,412 (out of which the population of Skarszewy amounts to 6,468, and the population of the rural part of the gmina is 7,944).

== Villages ==
Apart from the town of Skarszewy, Gmina Skarszewy contains the villages and settlements of Bączek, Barka, Bolesławowo, Bożepole Królewskie, Celmerostwo, Czarnocin, Demlin, Godziszewo, Godziszewo-Wybudowanie, Jaroszewy, Jastrzębce, Jastrzębie Skarszewskie, Junkrowy, Kamierowo, Kamierowskie Piece, Koźmin, Krawusin, Malary, Marianka, Mirowo Duże, Mirowo Małe, Nowe Gołębiewko, Nowy Wiec, Nygut, Obozin, Pogódki, Pogódki-Wybudowanie, Probostwo, Przerębska Huta, Rusia, Szczodrowo, Szczodrowski Młyn, Trzcianka, Wałachowo, Więckowy, Wilcze Góry, Wilki, Wolny Dwór, Zamkowa Góra and Zapowiednik.

== Neighbouring gminas ==
Gmina Skarszewy is bordered by the gminas of Liniewo, Nowa Karczma, Przywidz, Stara Kiszewa, Starogard Gdański, Tczew, Trąbki Wielkie and Zblewo.
