= Zamkowa Góra =

Settlement in Pomeranian Voivodeship, Poland

- Hamlet
- Location within Poland
- Coordinates: 54°4′46″N 18°22′42″E
- Country: Poland
- Voivodeship: Pomeranian
- County: Starogard
- Gmina: Skarszewy

Population
  - Total: 15
- Time zone: UTC+1 (CET)
  - Summer (DST): UTC+2 (CEST)
- Vehicle registration: GST

Zamkowa Góra [zamˈkɔva ˈɡura] is a hamlet in the administrative district of Gmina Skarszewy, within Starogard County, Pomeranian Voivodeship, in northern Poland. It is located in the ethnocultural region of Kociewie in the historic region of Pomerania.
