= Mestwinowo =

Village in Kociewie

- Settlement
- Location within Poland
- Coordinates: 54°2′58″N 18°18′35″E
- Country: Poland
- Voivodeship: Pomeranian
- County: Kościerzyna
- Gmina: Liniewo
- Population (2022): 10
- Time zone: UTC+1 (CET)
  - Summer (DST): UTC+2 (CEST)
- Number Zone: (+48) 58
- Vehicle registration: GKS

Mestwinowo [mɛstfiˈnɔvɔ] is a settlement in the administrative district of Gmina Liniewo, within Kościerzyna County, Pomeranian Voivodeship, in northern Poland. It is located within the historic region of Pomerania.

During the German occupation of Poland (World War II), in October 1939, the SS and Selbstschutz murdered 46 Polish farmers from Jaroszewy in the village, after they were previously deceitfully gathered for a formal meeting in their home village.
