= Bolesławowo, Starogard County =

Village in Pomeranian Voivodeship, Poland

Bolesławowo
- Village
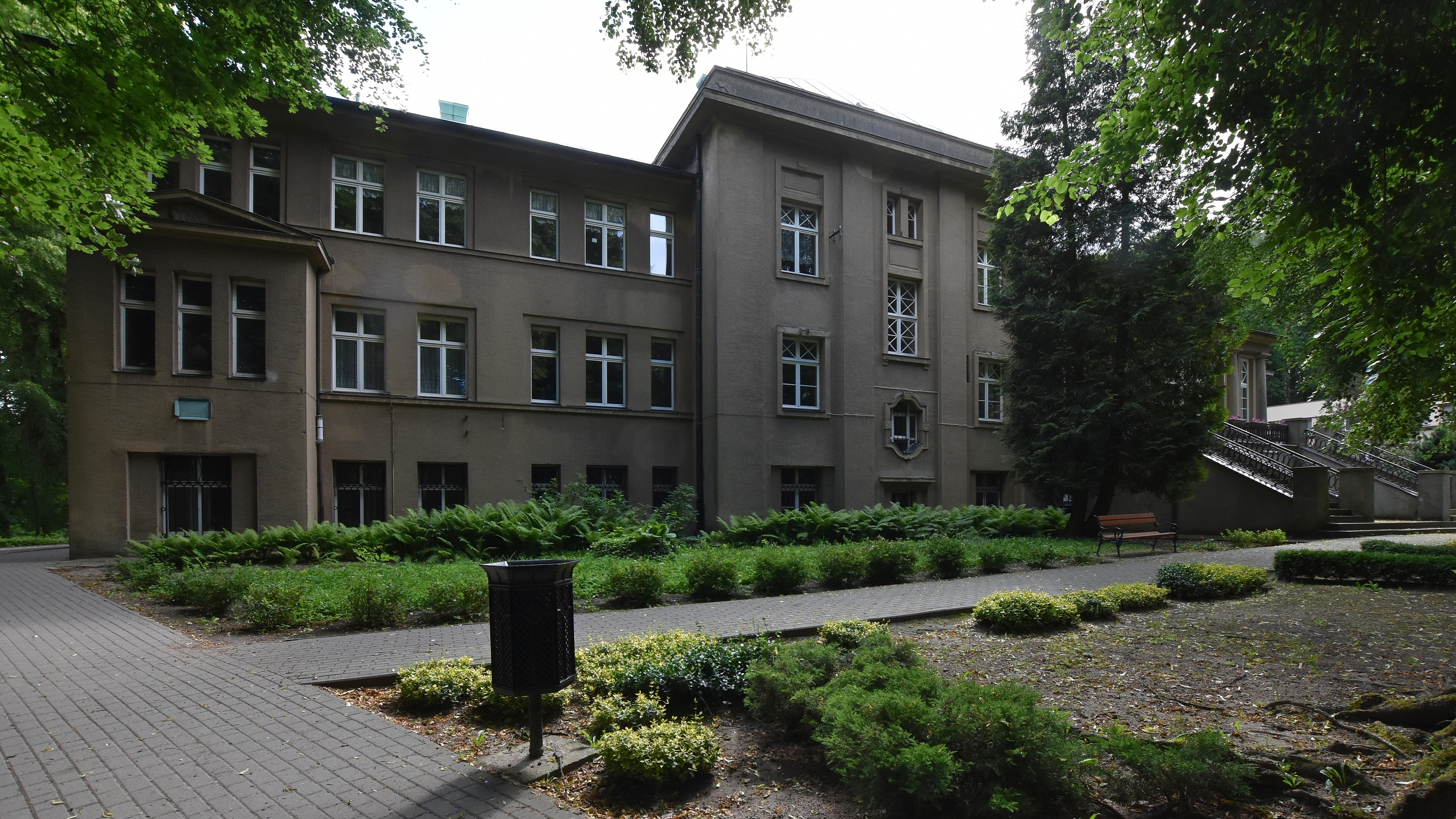
- School in Bolesławowo

- Location within Poland
- Coordinates: 54°4′23″N 18°29′9″E
- Country: Poland
- Voivodeship: Pomeranian
- County: Starogard
- Gmina: Skarszewy
- Elevation: 143.8 m (472 ft)

Population
  - Total: 684
- Time zone: UTC+1 (CET)
  - Summer (DST): UTC+2 (CEST)
- Vehicle registration: GST

Bolesławowo [bɔlɛswaˈvɔvɔ] is a village in the administrative district of Gmina Skarszewy, within Starogard County, Pomeranian Voivodeship, in northern Poland. It is located in the ethnocultural region of Kociewie in the historic region of Pomerania.
