= Malary, Starogard County =

Village in Pomeranian Voivodeship, Poland

Malary
- Village
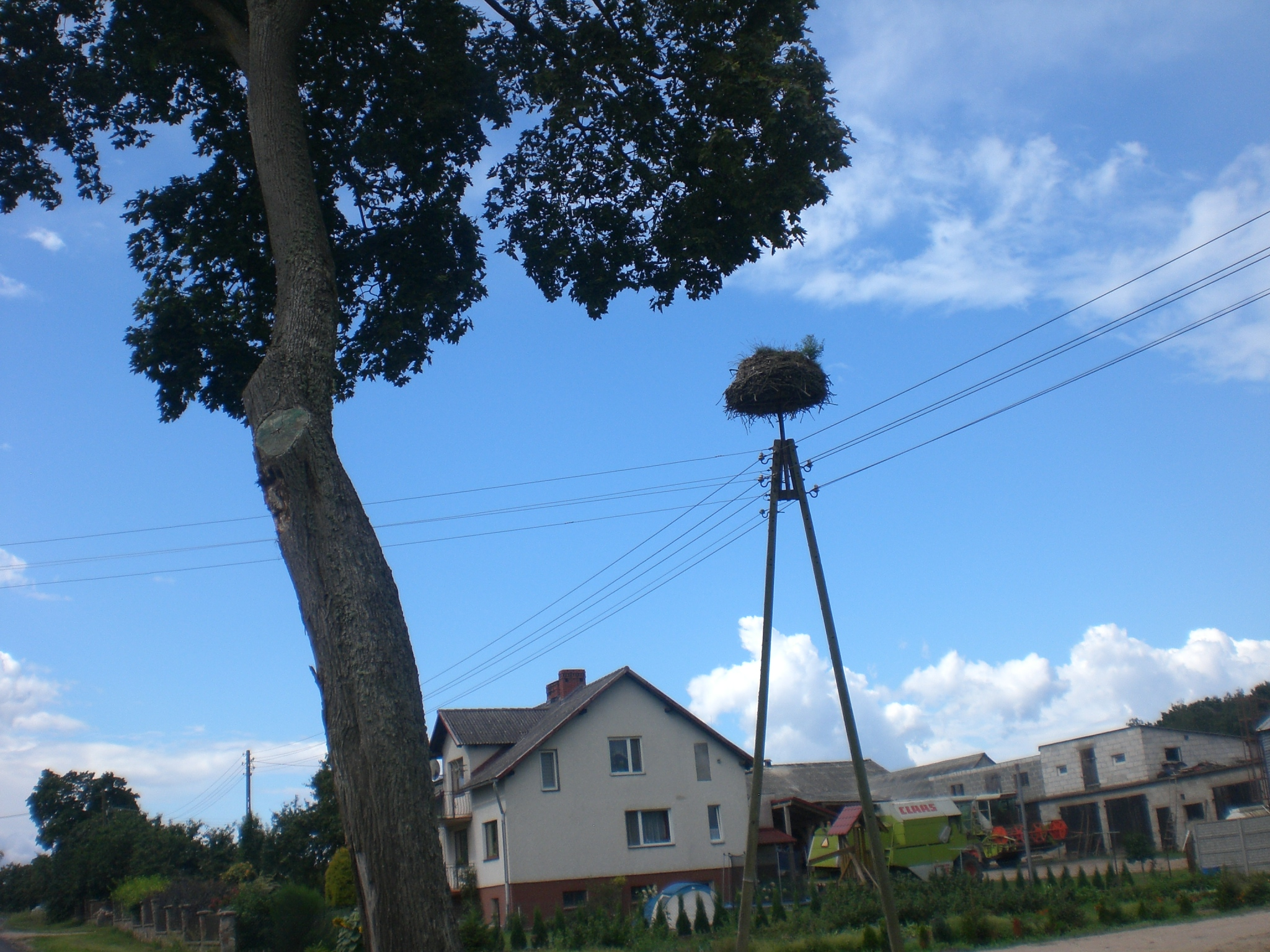

- Location within Poland
- Coordinates: 54°3′5″N 18°21′57″E
- Country: Poland
- Voivodeship: Pomeranian
- County: Starogard
- Gmina: Skarszewy
- Population: 104
- Time zone: UTC+1 (CET)
  - Summer (DST): UTC+2 (CEST)
- Vehicle registration: GST

Malary [maˈlarɨ] is a village in the administrative district of Gmina Skarszewy, within Starogard County, Pomeranian Voivodeship, in northern Poland. It is located within the ethnocultural region of Kociewie in the historic region of Pomerania.
