= Probostwo, Pomeranian Voivodeship =

Settlement in Pomeranian Voivodeship, Poland

Probostwo
- Settlement
- Location within Poland
- Coordinates: 54°3′17″N 18°24′29″E
- Country: Poland
- Voivodeship: Pomeranian
- County: Starogard
- Gmina: Skarszewy
- Population: 7
- Time zone: UTC+1 (CET)
  - Summer (DST): UTC+2 (CEST)
- Vehicle registration: GST

Probostwo [prɔˈbɔstfɔ] is a settlement in the administrative district of Gmina Skarszewy, within Starogard County, Pomeranian Voivodeship, in northern Poland. It is located in the ethnocultural region of Kociewie in the historic region of Pomerania.
