= Przerębska Huta, Starogard County =

Settlement in Pomeranian Voivodeship, Poland

Przerębska Huta
- Village
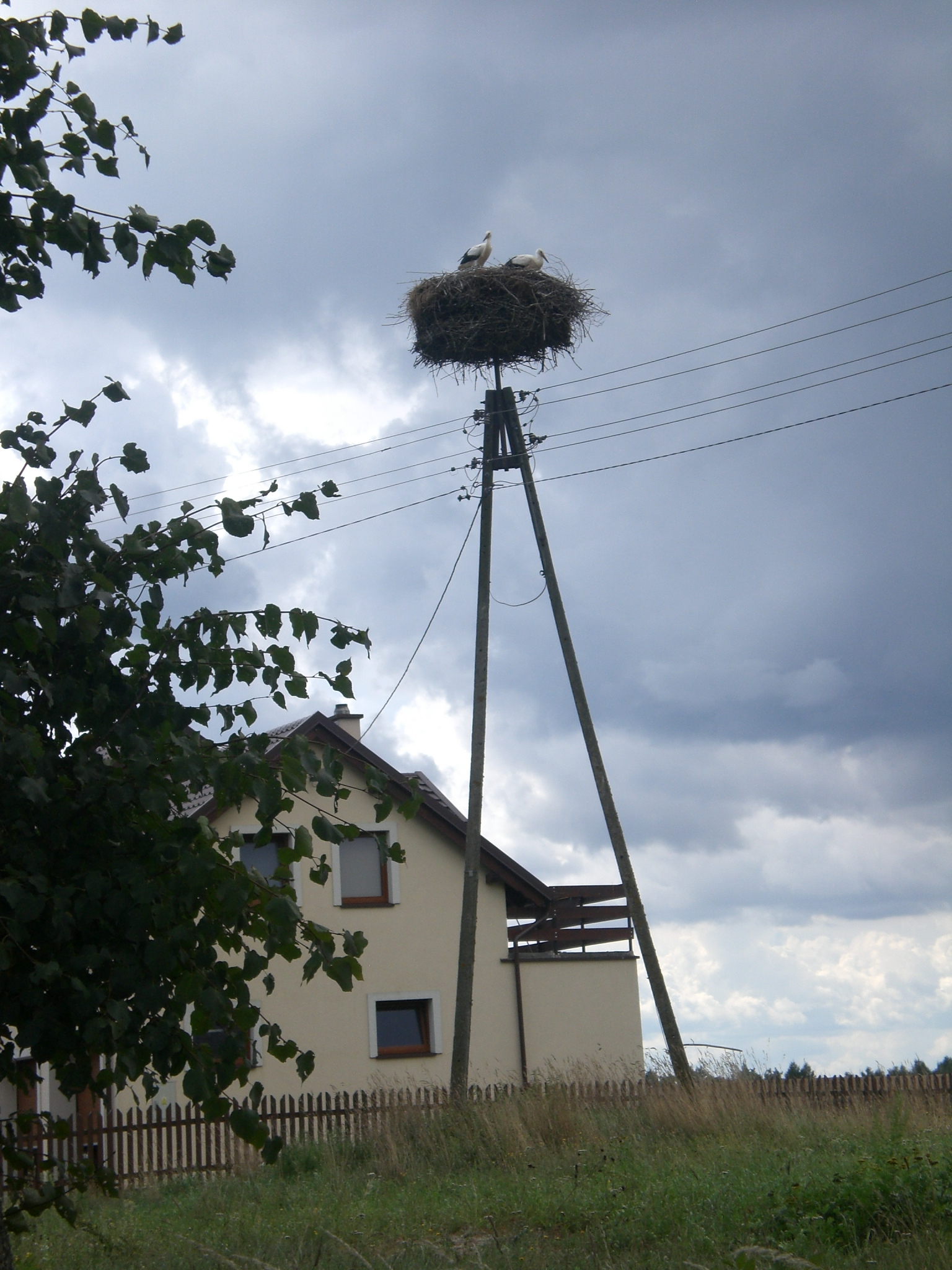

- Location within Poland
- Coordinates: 54°5′46″N 18°24′16″E
- Country: Poland
- Voivodeship: Pomeranian
- County: Starogard
- Gmina: Skarszewy
- Population: 46
- Time zone: UTC+1 (CET)
  - Summer (DST): UTC+2 (CEST)
- Vehicle registration: GST

Przerębska Huta [pʂɛˈrɛmpska ˈxuta] is a village in the administrative district of Gmina Skarszewy, within Starogard County, Pomeranian Voivodeship, in northern Poland. It is located in the ethnocultural region of Kociewie in the historic region of Pomerania.
