= Skarszewy =

Town in Poland

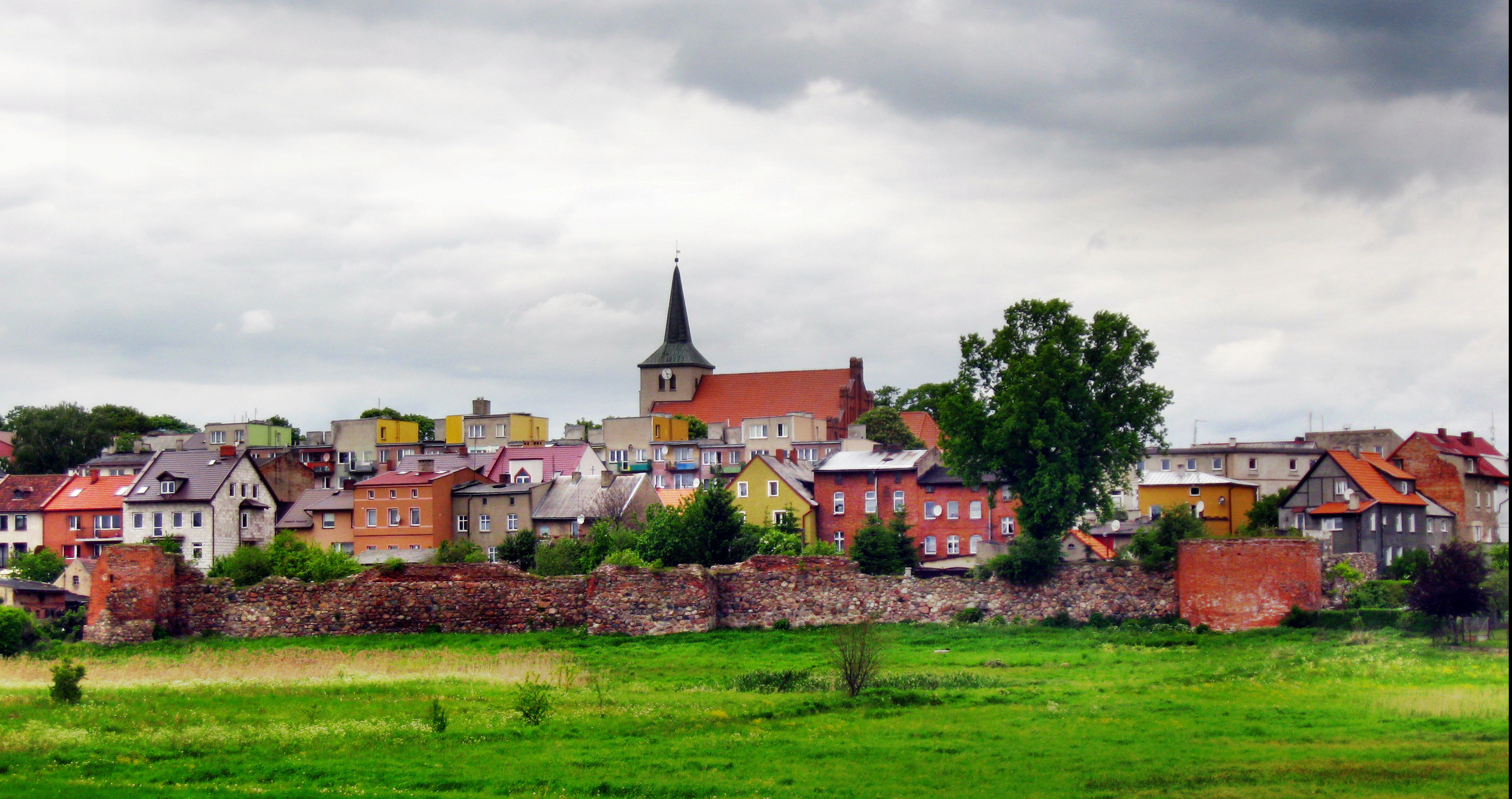
- Panorama of Skarszewy

- Coat of arms

- Location within Poland
- Coordinates: 54°4′2″N 18°26′45″E
- Country: Poland
- Voivodeship: Pomeranian
- County: Starogard
- Gmina: Skarszewy
- Established: 12th century
- Town rights: 1320

Government
  - Mayor: Jacek Pauli

Area
  - Total: 9.43 km^{2} (3.64 sq mi)

Population (2022)
  - Total: 6,468
  - Density: 686/km^{2} (1,780/sq mi)
- Time zone: UTC+1 (CET)
  - Summer (DST): UTC+2 (CEST)
- Postal code: 83-250
- Area code: +48 58
- Car plates: GST
- Website: http://www.skarszewy.pl

Skarszewy [skarˈʂɛvɨ] (Note: German: Schöneck in Westpreußen) is a town in Starogard Gdański County, Pomeranian Voivodeship, northern Poland. It is located within the ethnocultural region of Kociewie in the historic region of Pomerania, 40 kilometres (25 miles) south of Gdańsk. Population: 6,809 (30 June 2005). It is the seat of the urban-rural administrative district Gmina Skarszewy.

Founded in the medieval period, Skarszewy is a former royal town of Poland, which served as the capital of the Pomeranian Voivodeship from 1613 to 1772. The old town is enclosed by remains of 14th-century stone walls and its landmarks include the Gothic parish Church of St. Michael the Archangel with well-preserved Baroque furnishings, a preserved market square and a medieval castle of Knights Hospitaller, which in the early modern period housed a court in which Józef Wybicki, the author of the lyrics of the Polish national anthem, studied law. In 2005 the town was given the title the Pearl of Pomerania.

== History ==
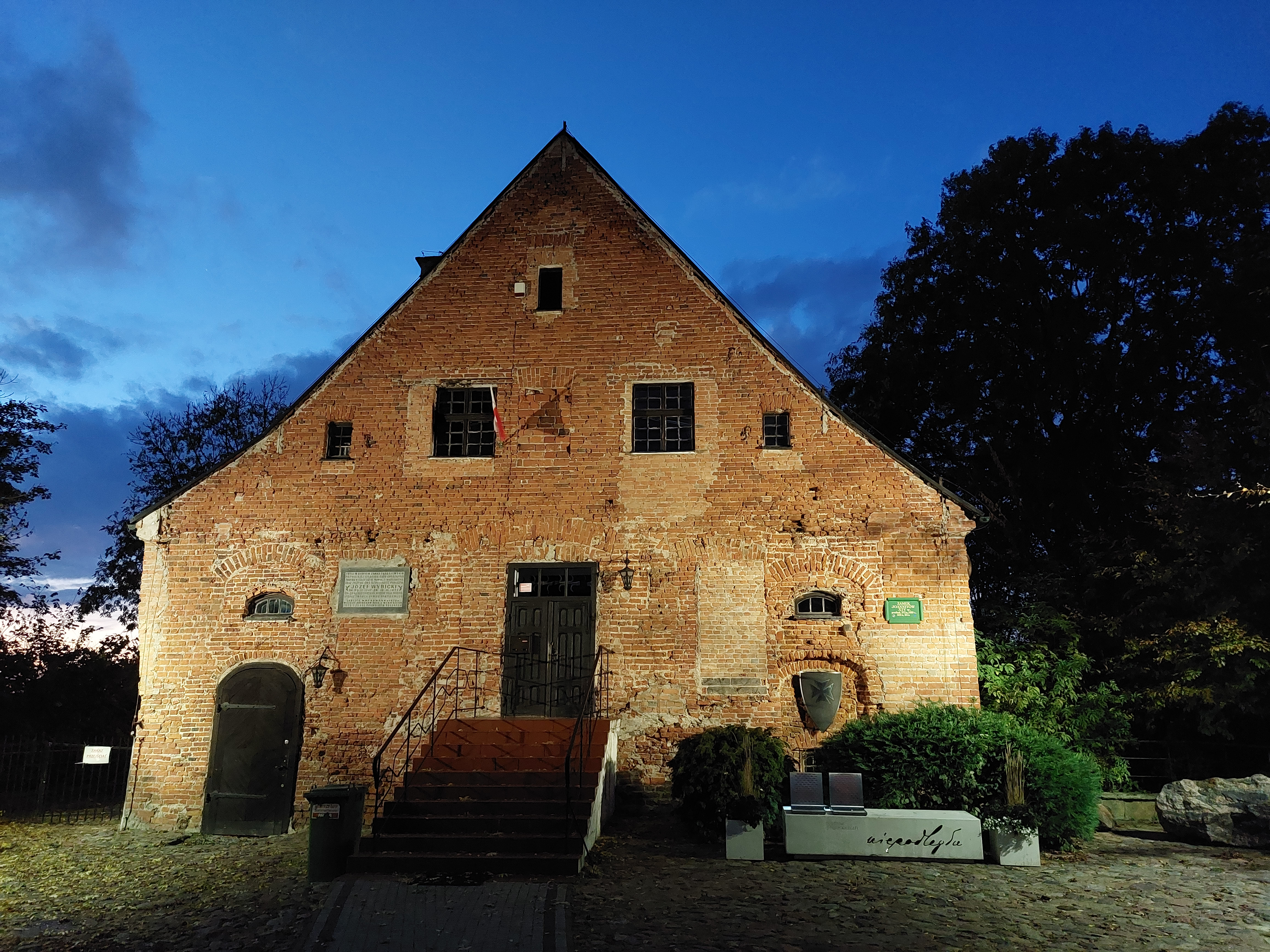
Rebuilt remains of the castle of Knights Hospitaller, later a court in which Józef Wybicki, the author of the lyrics of the Polish national anthem, studied law

The town was first mentioned as a seat of Knights Hospitaller in 1198. It was part of the medieval Kingdom of Poland until the 14th century. In 1320 it obtained town rights, and in 1370 it was sold by the Order of St. John to the Teutonic Order. In 1454, upon the request of the anti-Teutonic Prussian Confederation, the town was re-incorporated into the Kingdom of Poland by King Casimir IV Jagiellon. During the subsequent Thirteen Years' War, in 1455, it was ravaged by the Teutonic Knights, who finally renounced any claims to the town in 1466. Again within Poland, it was a royal town, administratively it was part of the Pomeranian Voivodeship in the province of Royal Prussia in the Greater Poland Province.

In 1613 Skarszewy became capital of the Pomeranian Voivodeship. Between 1629 and 1655 it was devastated by the Swedes. Large fires in the years 1708, 1714, 1731 destroyed almost all the buildings. In 1762–1765, Józef Wybicki, the author of the lyrics of the national anthem of Poland, studied law at the local court, located in the old castle. In 1772 the town, known in German as Schöneck, was annexed by the Kingdom of Prussia in the First Partition of Poland. It was subjected to Germanisation policies.

In 1871, with the Prussian-led unification of Germany, Schöneck became part of the German Empire. Until 1920, the town was part of the Berent district in the Prussian Province of West Prussia in Germany. According to the census of 1910, Schöneck had a population of 3,494, of which 2,258 (64.6%) were German-speaking, 1,131 (32.4%) were Polish-speaking, 2 (0.1%) were Kashubian-speaking and 102 (2.9%) were bilingual. At the beginning of the 20th century, Schöneck had a Protestant church, a Catholic church, a synagogue, a district court, an old castle (which at that time housed the dairy) and some medium-sized businesses. In 1906–1907, local Polish children joined the children school strikes against Germanisation that spread throughout the Prussian Partition of Poland.

Under the Treaty of Versailles, Skarszewy was reassigned to Poland, after the country regained independence. The Blue Army of Poland commanded by General Józef Haller entered Skarszewy on 30 January 1920, ending 148 years of Prussian rule. As part of the Second Polish Republic, administratively it was located in the Pomeranian Voivodeship. After the town became part of Poland, many ethnic Germans emigrated to Germany and by 1921, Germans became a minority in the town, comprising only around 1,000 (33.2%) out of a total population of 3,010.

During World War II, from 1939 to 1945 it was occupied and annexed by Germany and was administered as part of the Berent district in Reichsgau Danzig-West Prussia. Hundreds of Poles from Skarszewy and surrounding villages were imprisoned in the town, and later massacred in various places during the Intelligenzaktion in October and November 1939. Over 240 Poles, previously imprisoned in Skarszewy, including teachers, merchants, local officials, priests, activists, craftsmen, workers, farmers, were murdered in the nearby forest by the SS, Gestapo and Selbstschutz. Over 100 Poles were murdered in the forest between Skarszewy and Więckowy. The wójt of Gmina Skarszewy, Emil Więcki, was murdered in a massacre carried out in Mestwinowo. The local school principal was among Polish teachers and principals murdered in the Dachau concentration camp. In November 1939, around 1,000 Poles, mostly families of those murdered in the massacres, were expelled to the General Government in the more-eastern part of German-occupied Poland. Several local Poles were murdered by the Russians in the Katyn massacre in 1940.

Towards the end of the war, Soviet aircraft repeatedly bombed the town and on 8 March 1945 the Red Army's East Pomeranian Offensive burned parts of the town, causing the destruction of up to 40% of the buildings in Skarszewy. After the war, the town was restored to Poland and the remaining German population was expelled in accordance with the Potsdam Agreement.

In 2012, the town limits of Skarszewy were expanded, by including the settlement of Pólko.

Various sights of Skarszewy

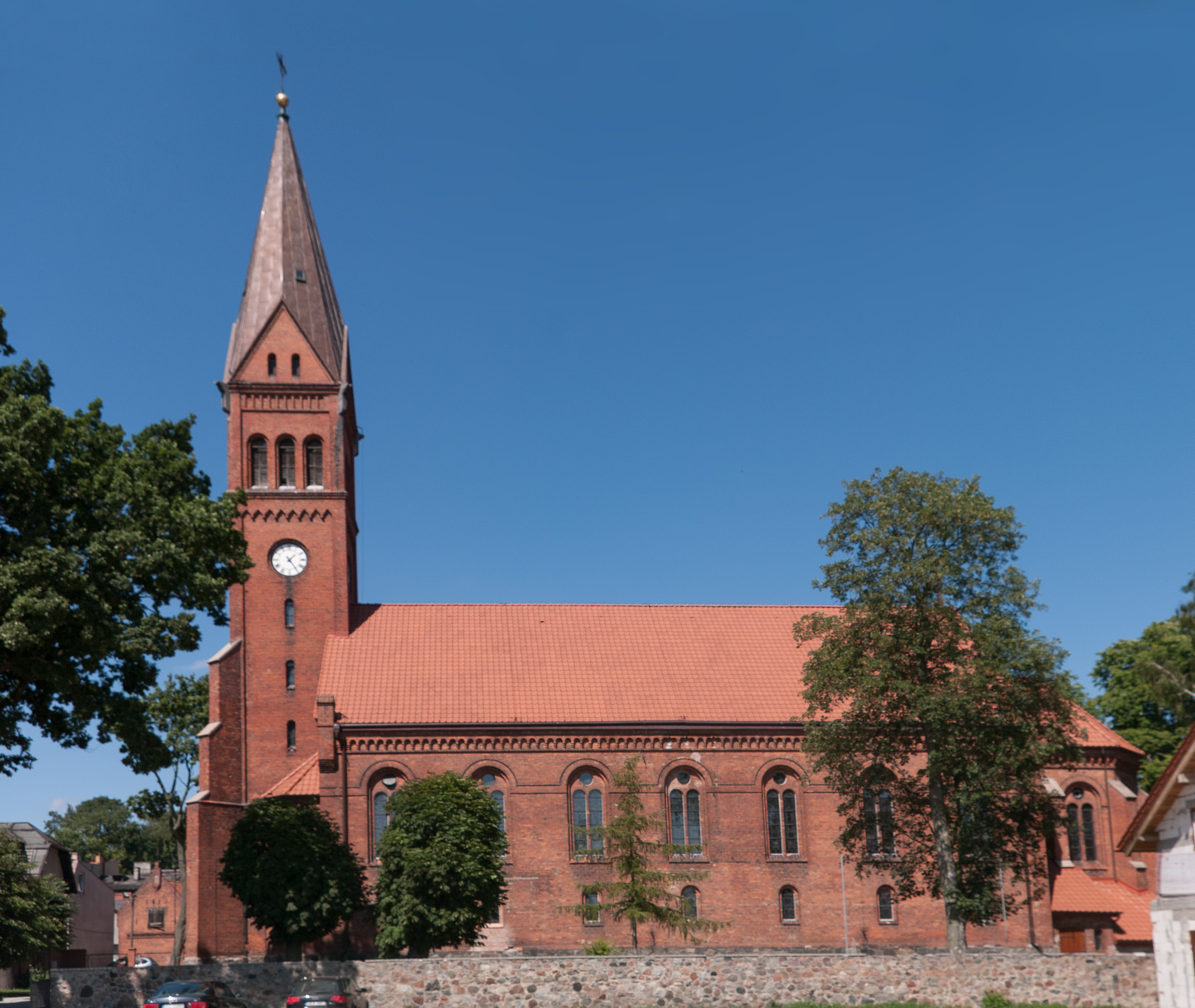
Maximilian Kolbe church

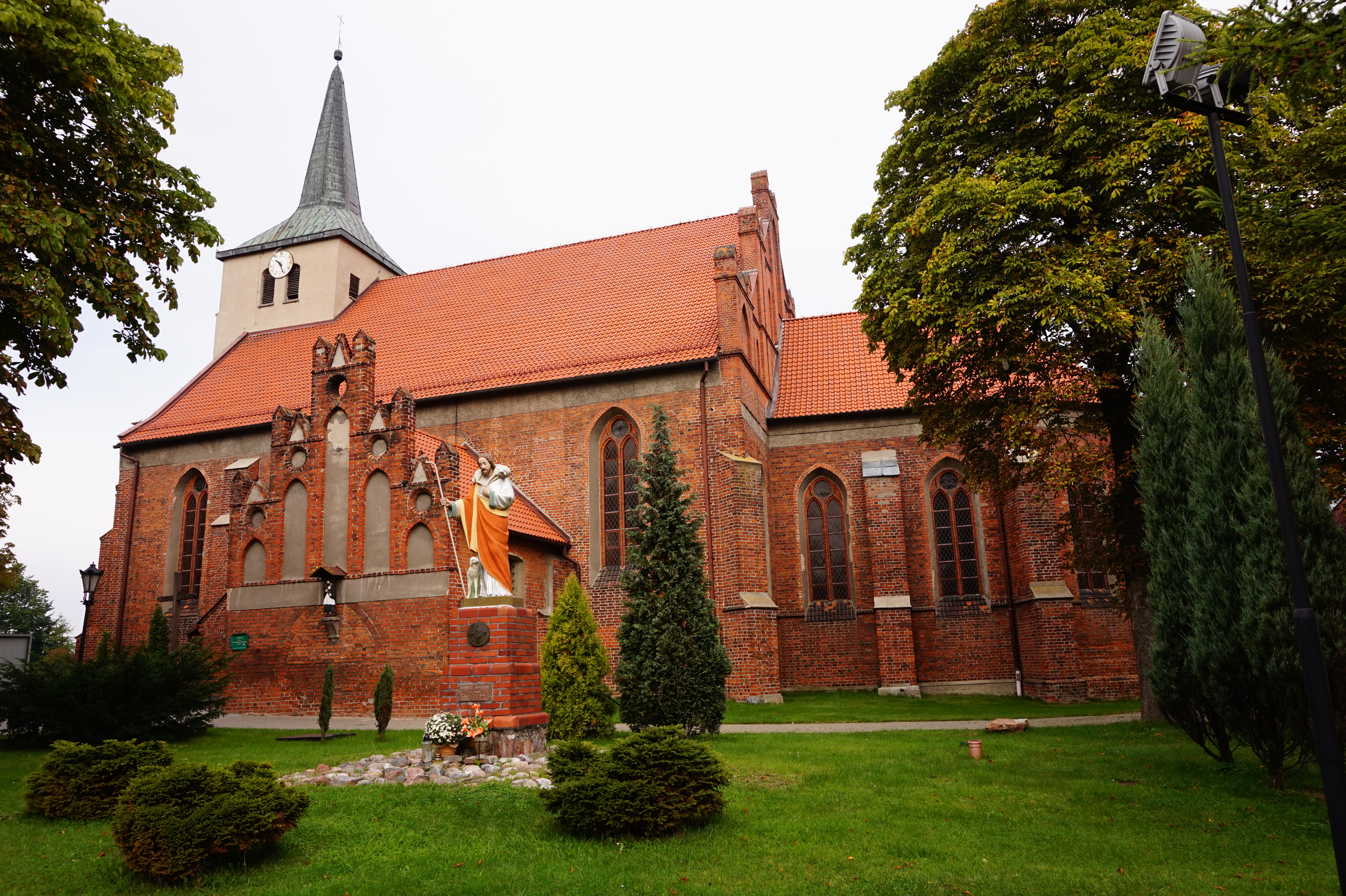
Saint Michael Archangel church

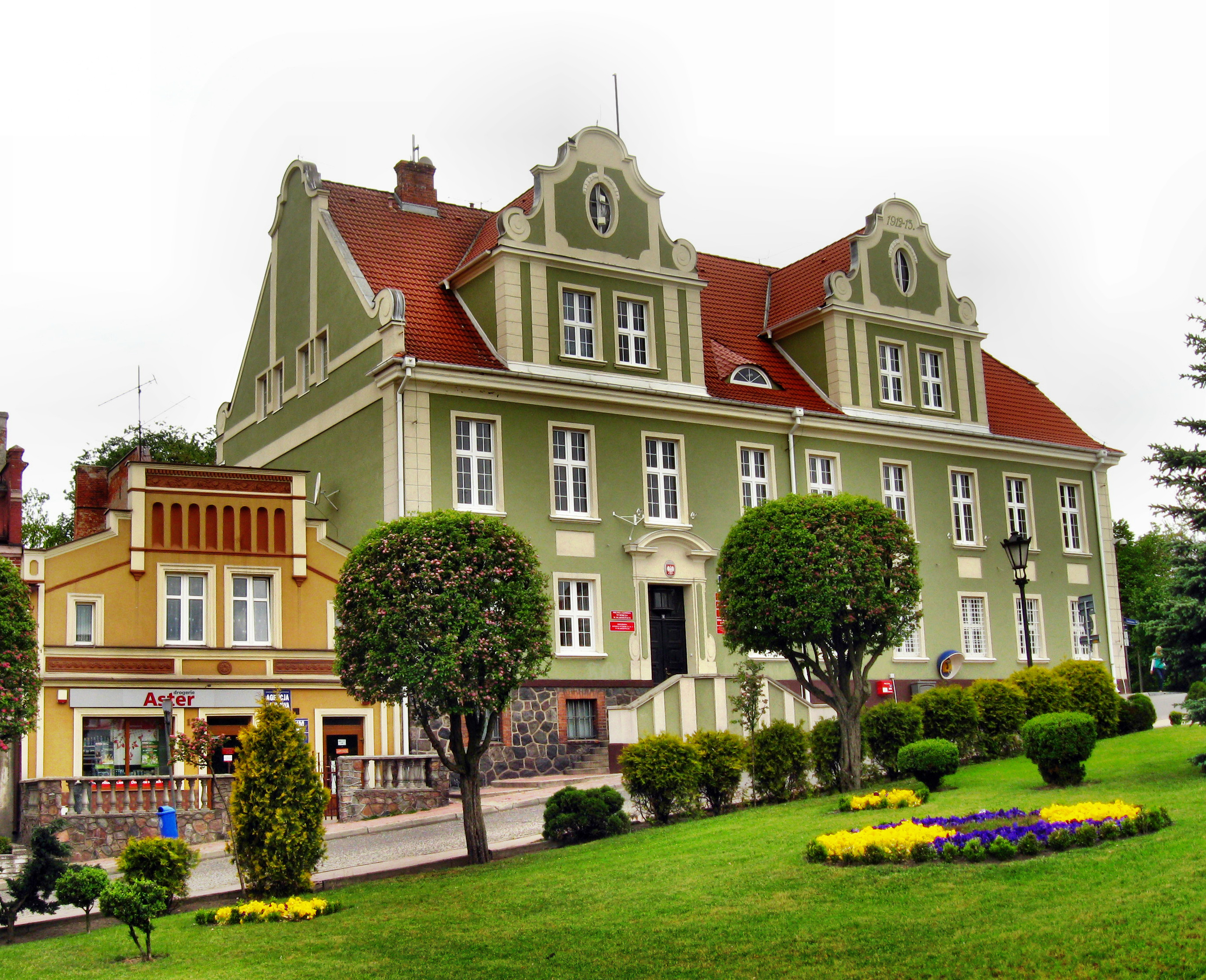
Town hall

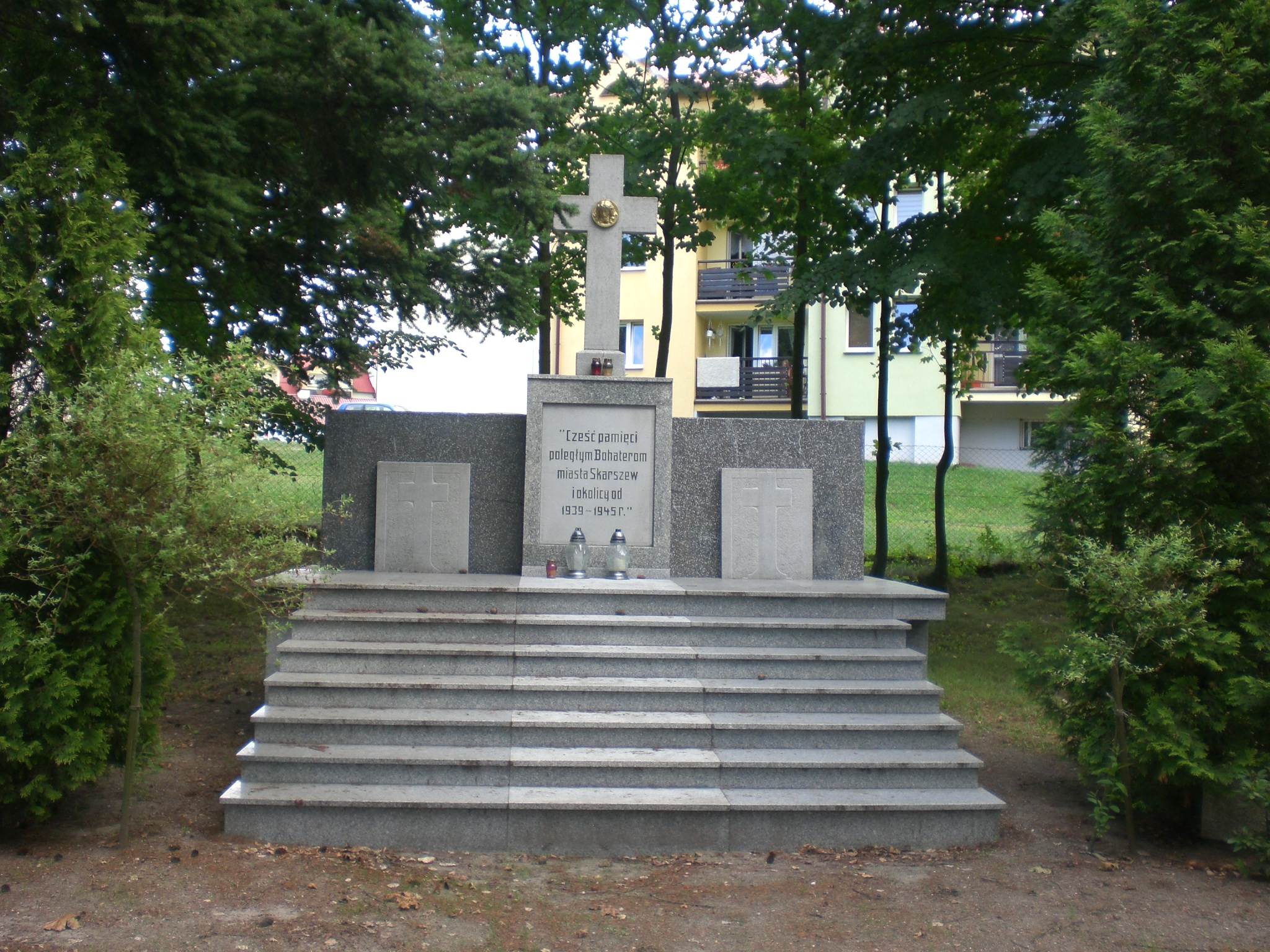
World War II memorial

== Transport ==
Skarszewy lies on the intersection of voivodeship road 224 with an unnumbered voivodeship road to Starogard Gdański.

The nearest railway station is in Starogard Gdański.

== Demographics ==
Historical population

Year	Pop.	±%
1910	3,494	—
1921	3,009	−13.9%
1931	3,456	+14.9%
1939	3,700	+7.1%

Year	Pop.	±%
1950	2,807	−24.1%
1960	3,662	+30.5%
2010	6,881	+87.9%

== Sport ==
Established in 1946, the football club Wietcisa Skarszewy represent the town in the Liga okręgowa. In 2023 the club was the winner of the annual Złota Bala cup presented by the sports news website Kociewski Sport.

== Notable people ==
- Józef Wybicki (1747–1822), Polish nobleman, jurist, poet, political activist, author of the lyrics of the national anthem of Poland
- Bartłomiej Smuczyński (born 1995), Polish footballer

== International relations ==
Skarszewy is twinned with:

- Leck, Germany
- Sandy, United Kingdom

Skarszewy was twinned with Sandy in Bedfordshire, England in 1996. Each year over summer, students from Sandy Secondary School, Stratton Upper School in Biggleswade and Bedford Girls' School in Bedford travel to Skarszewy for twelve days to teach English to some of the younger generation of the town.
