= Więckowy =

Village in Pomeranian Voivodeship, Poland

- Village
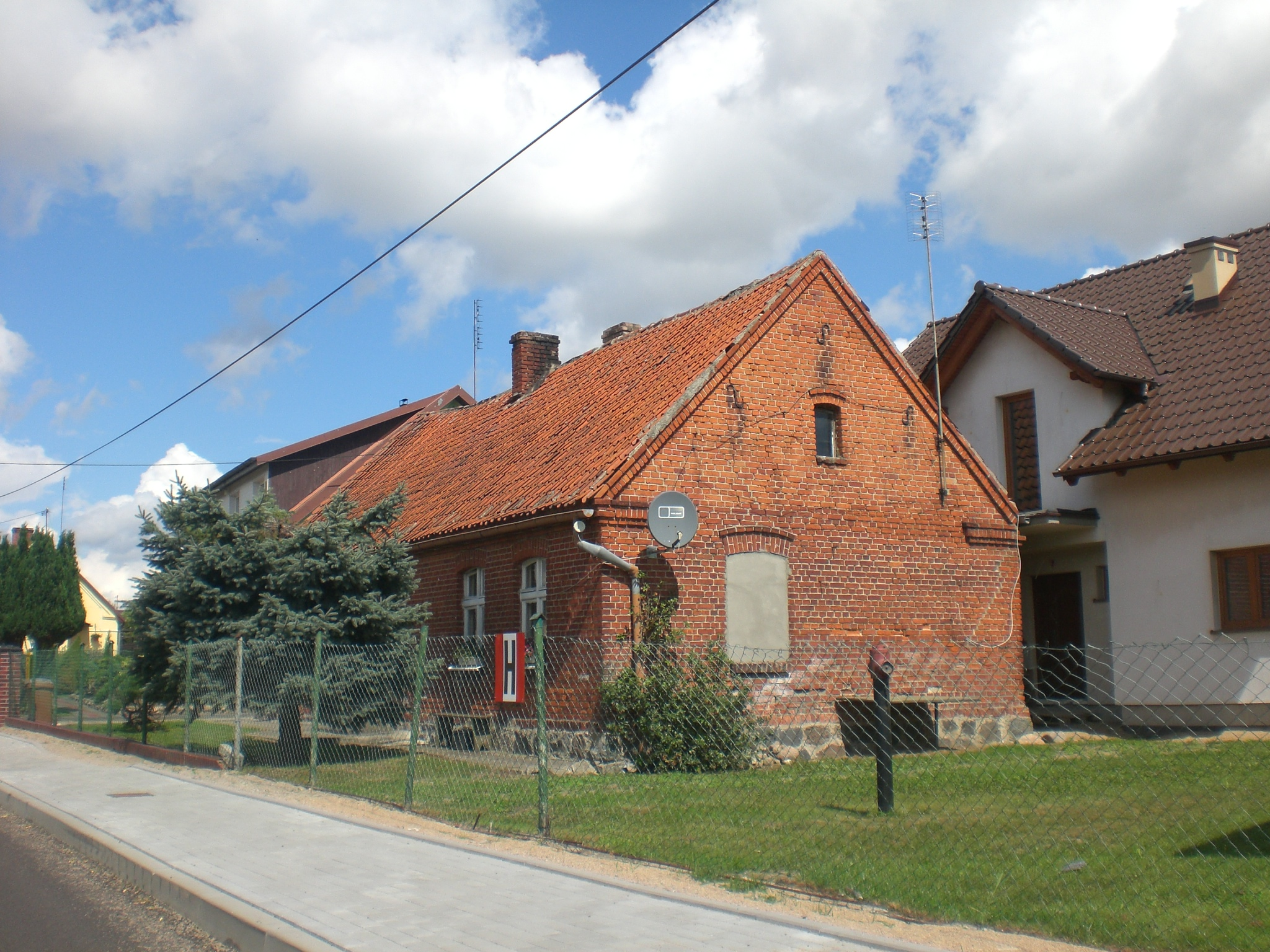
- Old house in Więckowy

- Location within Poland
- Coordinates: 54°3′36″N 18°23′14″E
- Country: Poland
- Voivodeship: Pomeranian
- County: Starogard
- Gmina: Skarszewy
- Population: 600
- Time zone: UTC+1 (CET)
  - Summer (DST): UTC+2 (CEST)
- Vehicle registration: GST

Więckowy [vjɛnt͡sˈkɔvɨ] is a village in the administrative district of Gmina Skarszewy, within Starogard County, Pomeranian Voivodeship, in northern Poland. It is located within the ethnocultural region of Kociewie in the historic region of Pomerania.

== History ==
Human settlement dates back to prehistoric times and there is a cemetery from the Iron Age near the village, now an archaeological site.

Więckowy was a private church village within the Polish Crown, administratively located in the Tczew County in the Pomeranian Voivodeship, owned by the monastery in Pelplin.

During the German occupation of Poland (World War II), the Germans murdered over 100 Poles in the forest between Skarszewy and Więckowy in October and November 1939 as part of the Intelligenzaktion.

== Education ==
There is a public primary school in Więckowy.
