= Balkany (disambiguation) =

Balkány is a town in Hungary.

Balkany may also refer to:

- Balkany (surname)
- Bałkany, Pomeranian Voivodeship, a village in Poland
- Bałkany, the Polish name for the Balkans
