= Frąca =

Frąca refers to the following villages in Poland

- Frąca, Gmina Osiek
- Frąca, Gmina Smętowo Graniczne

== See also ==
- Fracas (disambiguation)
- Franca (disambiguation)
