= Lisówko =

Village in Pomeranian Voivodeship, Poland

- Village
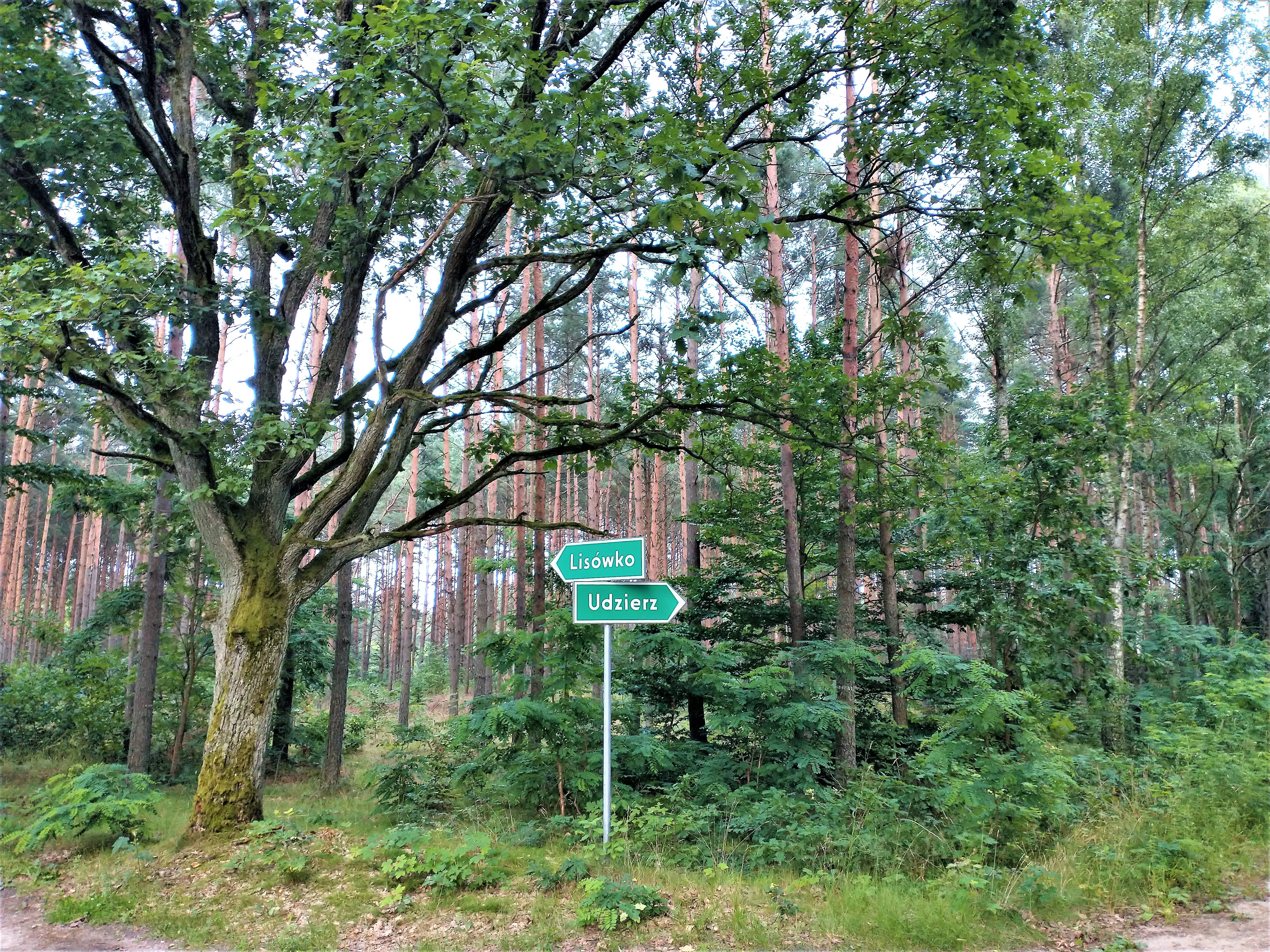
- A fingerpost pointing to Lisówko and nearby Udzierz

- Location within Poland
- Coordinates: 53°40′30″N 18°36′5″E
- Country: Poland
- Voivodeship: Pomeranian
- County: Starogard
- Gmina: Osiek

Population
  - Total: 110
- Time zone: UTC+1 (CET)
  - Summer (DST): UTC+2 (CEST)
- Vehicle registration: GST

Lisówko [liˈsufkɔ] is a village in the administrative district of Gmina Osiek, within Starogard County, Pomeranian Voivodeship, in northern Poland. It is located within the ethnocultural region of Kociewie in the historic region of Pomerania.

Seven Polish citizens were murdered by Nazi Germany in the village during World War II.
