= Pieczyska, Starogard County =

Village in Pomeranian Voivodeship, Poland

Pieczyska
- Settlement
- Location within Poland
- Coordinates: 53°43′14″N 18°17′22″E
- Country: Poland
- Voivodeship: Pomeranian
- County: Starogard
- Gmina: Osiek
- Time zone: UTC+1 (CET)
  - Summer (DST): UTC+2 (CEST)
- Vehicle registration: GST

Pieczyska [pjɛˈt͡ʂɨska] is a settlement in the administrative district of Gmina Osiek, within Starogard County, Pomeranian Voivodeship, in northern Poland. It is located in the ethnocultural region of Kociewie in the historic region of Pomerania.
