= Tusionite =

Yellow brown borate mineral

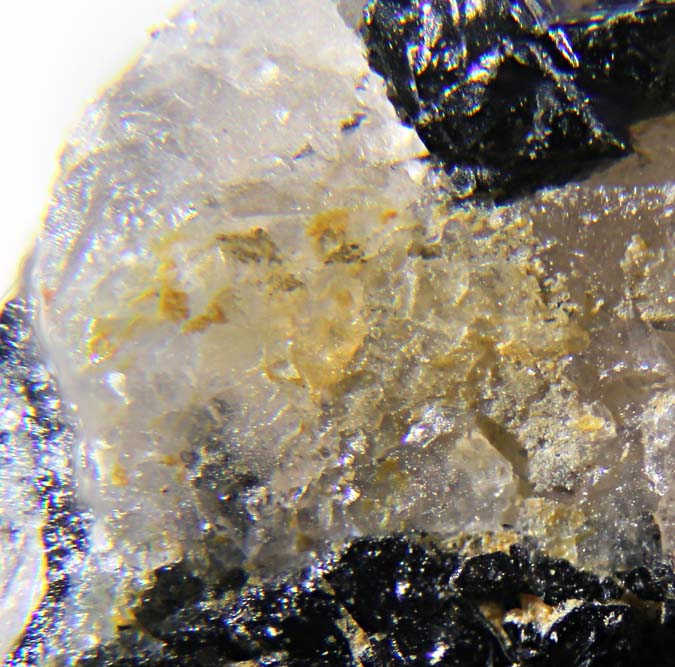
- Tusionite, a rare gem found in Tajikistan

General
- Category: Borate minerals
- Formula: MnSn(BO_{3})_{2}
- IMA symbol: Tsn
- Strunz classification: 6.AA.15
- Crystal system: Trigonal
- Crystal class: Rhombohedral (3̅); H-M symbol: (3̅)
- Space group: R3̅ (no. 148)

Identification
- Formula mass: 291.26 gm
- Color: Colorless, light yellow to yellow brown
- Crystal habit: Thin platy crystals in rosettes
- Cleavage: [001] Perfect
- Mohs scale hardness: 5–6
- Luster: Vitreous
- Streak: white
- Diaphaneity: Translucent
- Density: 4.73
- Optical properties: Uniaxial (−)
- Refractive index: nω = 1.854 nε = 1.752
- Birefringence: δ = 0.102
- Pleochroism: Orange yellow

Tusionite is a rare colorless to transparent to translucent yellow brown trigonal borate mineral with chemical formula: MnSn(BO_{3})_{2}. The mineral is composed of 18.86% manganese, 40.76% tin, 7.42% boron, and 32.96% oxygen. It is a late stage hydrothermal mineral and occurs rarely in granite pegmatites in miarolitic cavities.

Tusionite was named for the location where the mineral was first discovered and described in 1983 in the Tusion River Valley in the Pamir Mountains of Tajikistan. Tusionite has also been reported from Recice in the Czech Republic and in pegmatites at Thomas Mountain, Riverside County, California.

== See also ==
- Classification of minerals
- List of minerals
