= Leśny Dwór, Pomeranian Voivodeship =

Village in Pomeranian Voivodeship, Poland

Leśny Dwór
- Village
- Location within Poland
- Coordinates: 53°47′55″N 18°10′45″E
- Country: Poland
- Voivodeship: Pomeranian
- County: Starogard
- Gmina: Osieczna
- Population (2022): 8
- Time zone: UTC+1 (CET)
  - Summer (DST): UTC+2 (CEST)
- Vehicle registration: GST

Leśny Dwór [ˈlɛɕnɨ ˈdvur] is a village in the administrative district of Gmina Osieczna, within Starogard County, Pomeranian Voivodeship, in northern Poland. It is located within the ethnocultural region of Kociewie in the historic region of Pomerania.
