= Jastrzębie, Pomeranian Voivodeship =

Village in Pomeranian Voivodeship, Poland

Jastrzębie
- Colony
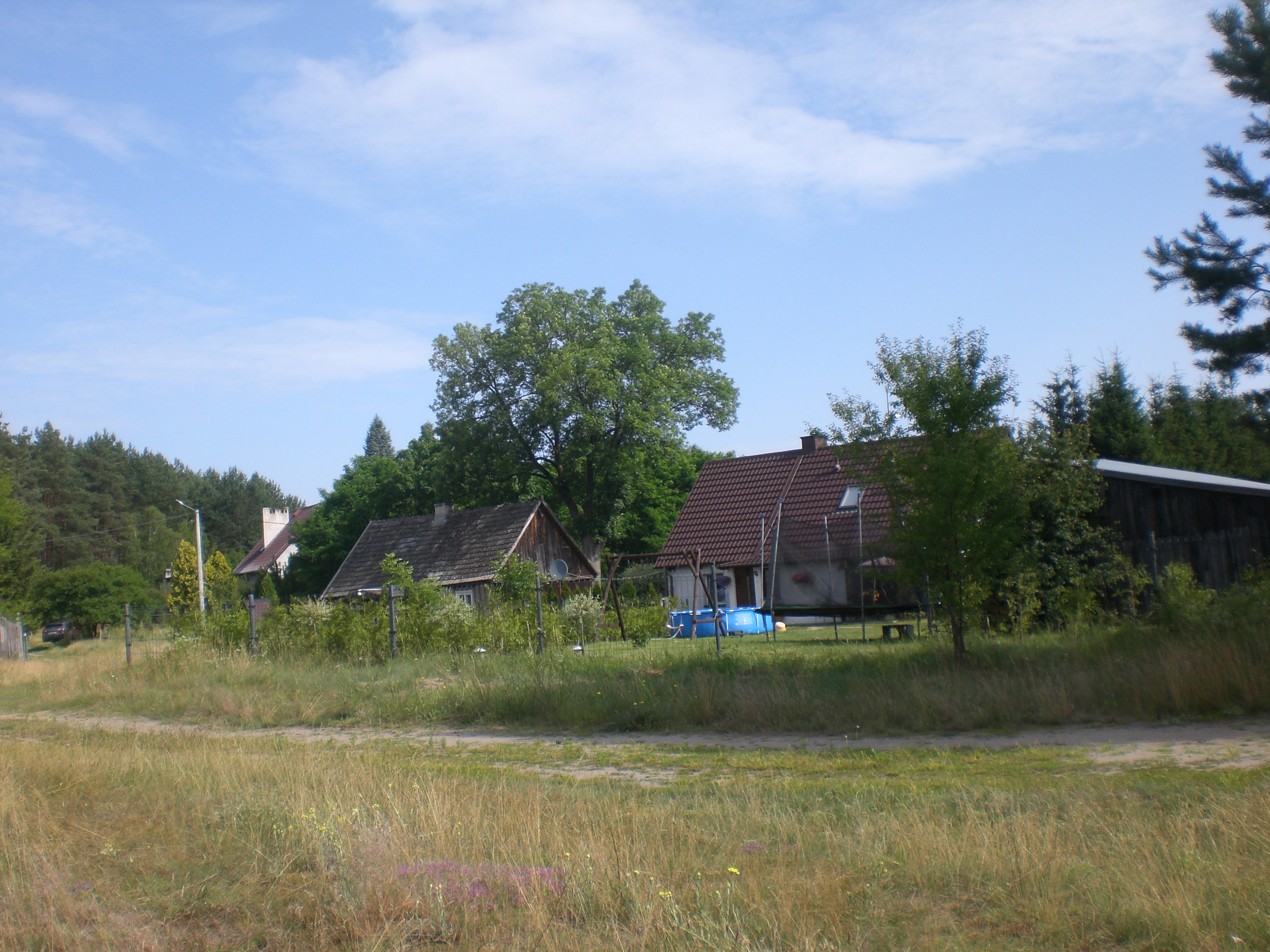

- Location within Poland
- Coordinates: 53°49′30″N 18°8′1″E
- Country: Poland
- Voivodeship: Pomeranian
- County: Starogard
- Gmina: Osieczna

Population (2022)(approx.)
  - Total: 54
- Time zone: UTC+1 (CET)
  - Summer (DST): UTC+2 (CEST)
- Vehicle registration: GST

Jastrzębie [jasˈtʂɛmbjɛ] is a colony in the administrative district of Gmina Osieczna, within Starogard County, Pomeranian Voivodeship, in northern Poland. It is located within the ethnocultural region of Kociewie in the historic region of Pomerania.

== History ==
During the German occupation of Poland (World War II), the Polish resistance printed the Głos Serca Polskiego Polish underground newspaper in Jastrzębie.
