= Starzyska =

Village in Pomeranian Voivodeship, Poland

- Colony
- Location within Poland
- Coordinates: 53°47′17″N 18°9′50″E
- Country: Poland
- Voivodeship: Pomeranian
- County: Starogard
- Gmina: Osieczna

Population (2022)
  - Total: 25
- Time zone: UTC+1 (CET)
  - Summer (DST): UTC+2 (CEST)
- Vehicle registration: GST

Starzyska [staˈʐɨska] is a colony in the administrative district of Gmina Osieczna, within Starogard County, Pomeranian Voivodeship, in northern Poland. It is located in the ethnocultural region of Kociewie in the historic region of Pomerania.
