= Owcze Błota =

Village in Pomeranian Voivodeship, Poland

- Village
- Location within Poland
- Coordinates: 53°47′59″N 18°12′13″E
- Country: Poland
- Voivodeship: Pomeranian
- County: Starogard
- Gmina: Osieczna
- Population (2022): 4
- Time zone: UTC+1 (CET)
  - Summer (DST): UTC+2 (CEST)
- Vehicle registration: GST

Owcze Błota [ˈɔft͡ʂɛ ˈbwɔta] is a village in the administrative district of Gmina Osieczna, within Starogard County, Pomeranian Voivodeship, in northern Poland. It is located in the ethnocultural region of Kociewie in the historic region of Pomerania.
