= Kasparus =

Village in Pomeranian Voivodeship, Poland

- Village
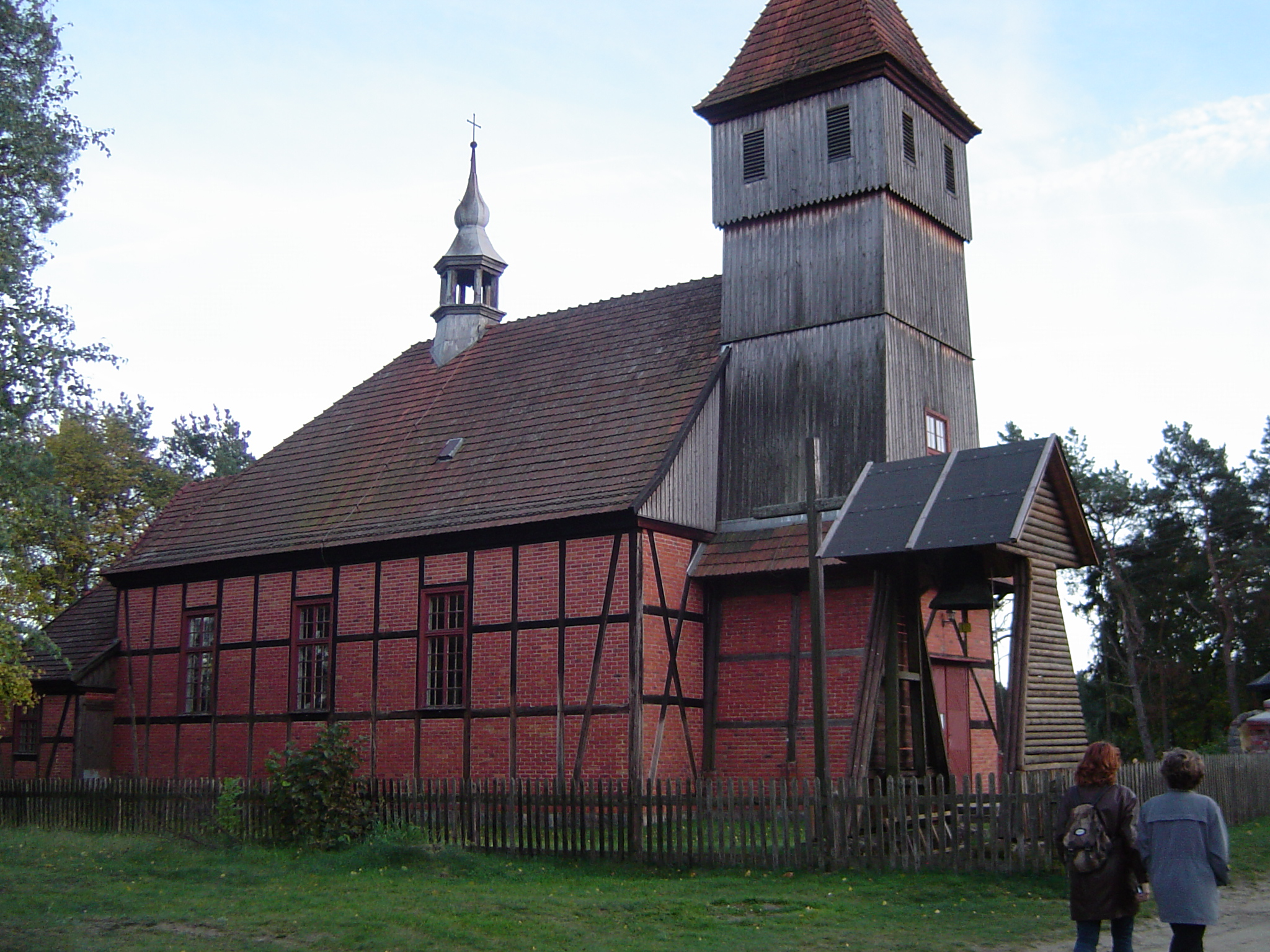
- The village church

- Location within Poland
- Coordinates: 53°44′27″N 18°21′39″E
- Country: Poland
- Voivodeship: Pomeranian
- County: Starogard
- Gmina: Osiek
- Population: 180
- Time zone: UTC+1 (CET)
  - Summer (DST): UTC+2 (CEST)
- Vehicle registration: GST
- Website: http://www.kasparus.pl

Kasparus [kasˈparus] is a village in the administrative district of Gmina Osiek, within Starogard County, Pomeranian Voivodeship, in northern Poland. It is located within the ethnocultural region of Kociewie in the historic region of Pomerania.
