= Szlaga-Młyn =

Village in Pomeranian Voivodeship, Poland

- Settlement
- Location within Poland
- Coordinates: 53°44′18″N 18°22′58″E
- Country: Poland
- Voivodeship: Pomeranian
- County: Starogard
- Gmina: Osiek
- Founded: 1722

Population
  - Total: 17
- Time zone: UTC+1 (CET)
  - Summer (DST): UTC+2 (CEST)
- Vehicle registration: GST

Szlaga-Młyn [ˈʂlaɡa ˈmwɨn] is a settlement in the administrative district of Gmina Osiek, within Starogard County, Pomeranian Voivodeship, in northern Poland. It is located in the ethnocultural region of Kociewie in the historic region of Pomerania.

The settlement was established in 1722 by decree of Polish King Augustus II the Strong.

== Demographics ==
Historical population
Year	Pop.	±%
1780	19	—
1885	22	+15.8%
