= Luby =

Luby may refer to:

== People ==
- Gloria Lindsay Luby, Canadian politician
- Kia Luby, Australian actress and television presenter
- Kurt Luby, British auto racing driver
- Michael Luby, American mathematician and computer scientist
- Pat Luby, American baseball player
- Thomas Clarke Luby, Irish revolutionary and author
- Štefan Luby, Slovak scientist and book writer

== Places ==
- Luby (Cheb District), a town in the Czech Republic
- Łuby (disambiguation), places in Poland
