= Gmina Osieczna =

Gmina Osieczna may refer to either of the following administrative districts in Poland:

- Gmina Osieczna, Greater Poland Voivodeship
- Gmina Osieczna, Pomeranian Voivodeship
