= Dębia Góra =

- Settlement
- Location within Poland
- Coordinates: 53°41′50″N 18°25′2″E
- Country: Poland
- Voivodeship: Pomeranian
- County: Starogard
- Gmina: Osiek
- Population: 17

Dębia Góra [ˈdɛmbja ˈɡura] is a settlement in the administrative district of Gmina Osiek, within Starogard County, Pomeranian Voivodeship, in northern Poland.

For details of the history of the region, see History of Pomerania.
