= Kałębnica =

Settlement in Kociewie

Kałębnica Kalemba
- Hamlet
- Location within Poland
- Country: Poland
- Voivodeship: Pomeranian
- County: Starogard
- Gmina: Osiek
- Time zone: UTC+1 ({{{timezone}}}CET)
  - Summer (DST): UTC+2 ({{{timezone_DST}}}CESTCEST)
- Postal code: 83-221
- SIMC: 0168604
- Vehicle registration: GTC

Kałębnica (alternitively Kalemba) is a hamlet in the administrative district of Gmina Osiek, within Starogard County, Pomeranian Voivodeship, in northern Poland. It is located in the ethnocultural region of Kociewie.
