= Zdrójki, Starogard County =

Village in Pomeranian Voivodeship, Poland

Zdrójki
- Settlement
- Location within Poland
- Coordinates: 53°42′36″N 18°20′22″E
- Country: Poland
- Voivodeship: Pomeranian
- County: Starogard
- Gmina: Osiek
- Time zone: UTC+1 (CET)
  - Summer (DST): UTC+2 (CEST)
- Vehicle registration: GST

Zdrójki [ˈzdrui̯ki] is a settlement in Gmina Osiek, within Starogard County, Pomeranian Voivodeship, in northern Poland. It is located in the ethnocultural region of Kociewie in the historic region of Pomerania.
