= Osówek, Starogard County =

Village in Pomeranian Voivodeship, Poland

Osówek
- Village
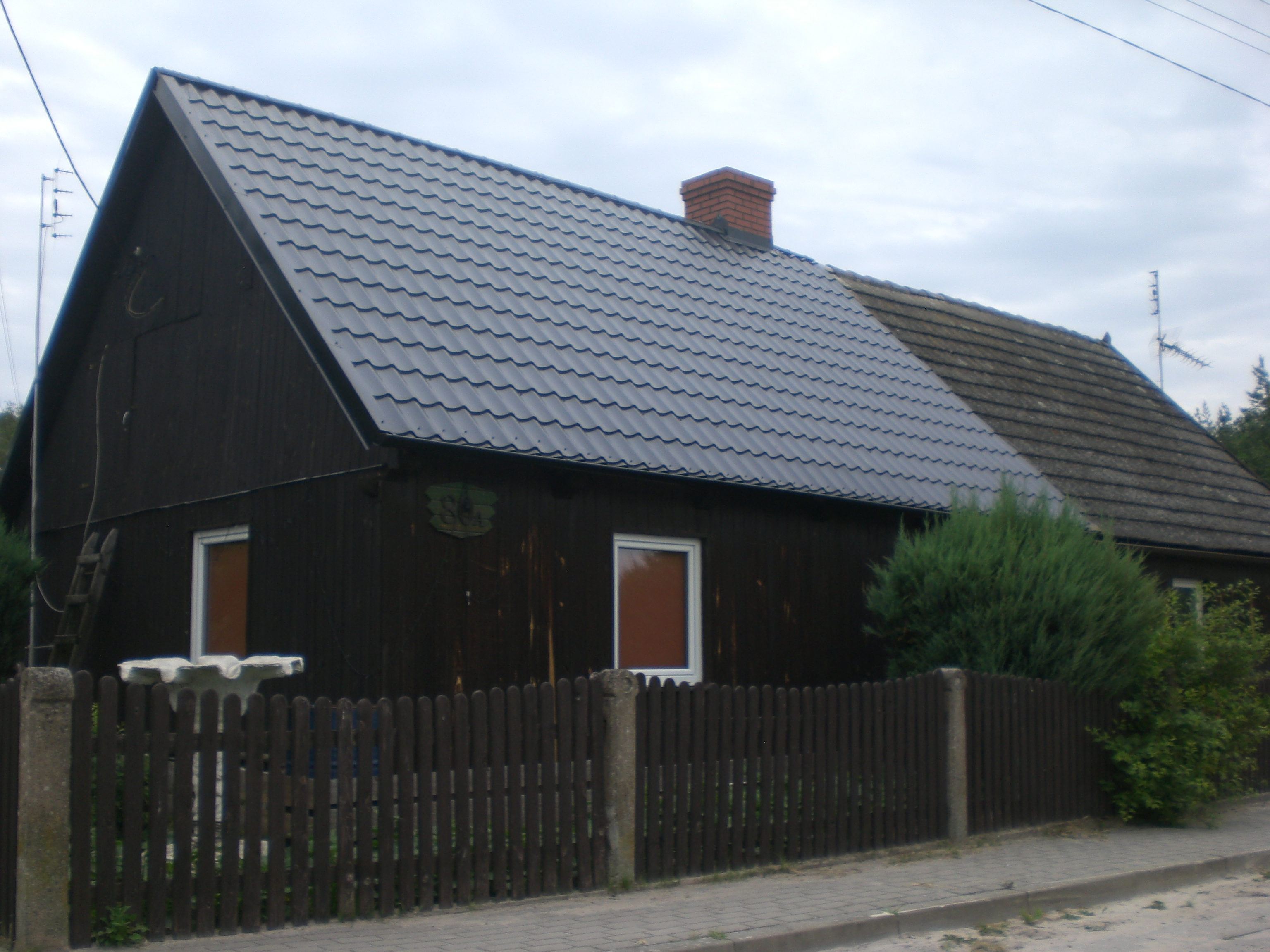
- Timber framed house in the village

- Location within Poland
- Coordinates: 53°46′48″N 18°8′23″E
- Country: Poland
- Voivodeship: Pomeranian
- County: Starogard
- Gmina: Osieczna
- Population (2022): 386
- Time zone: UTC+1 (CET)
  - Summer (DST): UTC+2 (CEST)
- Postal code: 83-243
- Area code: (+48) 58
- Vehicle registration: GST

Osówek [ɔˈsuvɛk] is a village in the administrative district of Gmina Osieczna, within Starogard County, Pomeranian Voivodeship, in northern Poland. It is located in the ethnocultural region of Kociewie in the historic region of Pomerania.
