= Cisowy =

Village in Pomeranian Voivodeship, Poland

- Village
- Location within Poland
- Coordinates: 53°42′5″N 18°35′27″E
- Country: Poland
- Voivodeship: Pomeranian
- County: Starogard
- Gmina: Osiek
- Time zone: UTC+1 (CET)
  - Summer (DST): UTC+2 (CEST)
- Vehicle registration: GST

Cisowy [t͡ɕiˈsɔvɨ] is a village in the administrative district of Gmina Osiek, within Starogard County, Pomeranian Voivodeship, in northern Poland. It is located within the ethnocultural region of Kociewie in the historic region of Pomerania.

Eight Polish citizens were murdered by Nazi Germany in the village during World War II.
