= Nowy Dwór, Starogard County =

Village in Pomeranian Voivodeship, Poland

Nowy Dwór
- Settlement
- Location within Poland
- Coordinates: 53°46′40″N 18°17′19″E
- Country: Poland
- Voivodeship: Pomeranian
- County: Starogard
- Gmina: Osieczna

Population (2022)
  - Total: 9
- Time zone: UTC+1 (CET)
  - Summer (DST): UTC+2 (CEST)
- Vehicle registration: GST

Nowy Dwór [ˈnɔvɨ ˈdvur] is a settlement in the administrative district of Gmina Osieczna, within Starogard County, Pomeranian Voivodeship, in northern Poland. It is located within the ethnocultural region of Kociewie in the historic region of Pomerania.
