= Skrzynia, Pomeranian Voivodeship =

Village in Pomeranian Voivodeship, Poland

Skrzynia
- Settlement
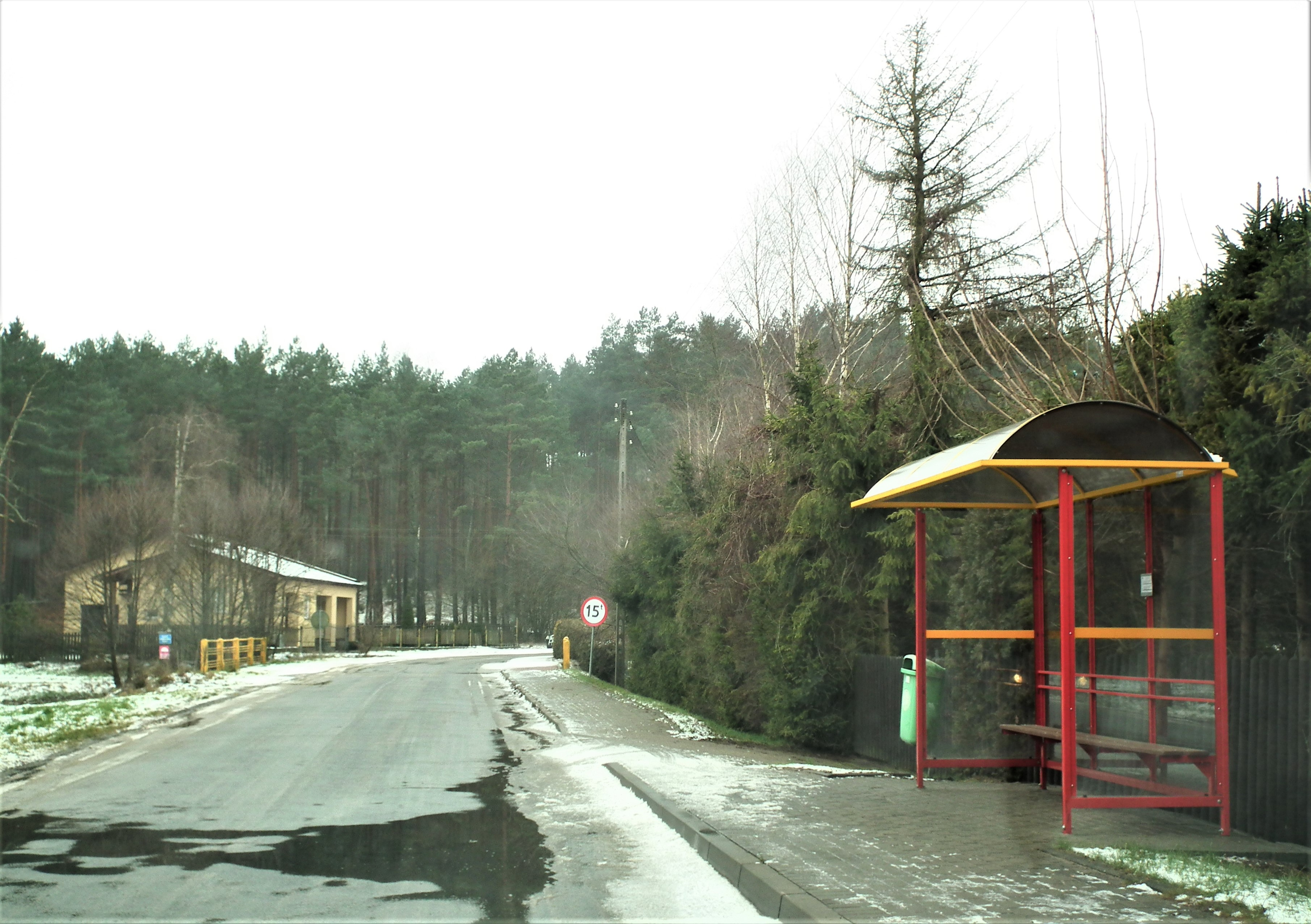

- Location within Poland
- Coordinates: 53°43′55″N 18°25′21″E
- Country: Poland
- Voivodeship: Pomeranian
- County: Starogard
- Gmina: Osiek
- Time zone: UTC+1 (CET)
  - Summer (DST): UTC+2 (CEST)
- Vehicle registration: GST

Skrzynia [ˈskʂɨɲa] is a settlement in the administrative district of Gmina Osiek, within Starogard County, Pomeranian Voivodeship, in northern Poland. It is located in the ethnocultural region of Kociewie in the historic region of Pomerania.
