= Długie, Pomeranian Voivodeship =

Village in Pomeranian Voivodeship, Poland

Długie
- Village
- Location within Poland
- Coordinates: 53°46′28″N 18°20′52″E
- Country: Poland
- Voivodeship: Pomeranian
- County: Starogard
- Gmina: Osieczna
- Population (2022): 31
- Time zone: UTC+1 (CET)
  - Summer (DST): UTC+2 (CEST)
- Vehicle registration: GST

Długie [ˈdwuɡʲɛ] is a village in the administrative district of Gmina Osieczna, within Starogard County, Pomeranian Voivodeship, in northern Poland. It is located within the ethnocultural region of Kociewie in the historic region of Pomerania.

== Etymology ==
The name "Dlugie" translates to "long" which may refer to the shape of the village or its historical road layout.

== History ==
Długie was a royal village of the Polish Crown, administratively located in the Tczew County in the Pomeranian Voivodeship. It was annexed by Prussia in the First Partition of Poland in 1772, and restored to Poland, after Poland regained independence in 1918.
