= Wycinki Małe =

Village in Pomeranian Voivodeship, Poland

- Village
- Location within Poland
- Coordinates: 53°42′38″N 18°30′34″E
- Country: Poland
- Voivodeship: Pomeranian
- County: Starogard
- Gmina: Osiek
- Time zone: UTC+1 (CET)
  - Summer (DST): UTC+2 (CEST)
- Vehicle registration: GST

Wycinki Małe [vɨˈt͡ɕinki ˈmawɛ] is a village in the administrative district of Gmina Osiek, within Starogard County, Pomeranian Voivodeship, in northern Poland. It is located in the ethnocultural region of Kociewie in the historic region of Pomerania.
