= Skórzenno =

Village in Pomeranian Voivodeship, Poland

- Village
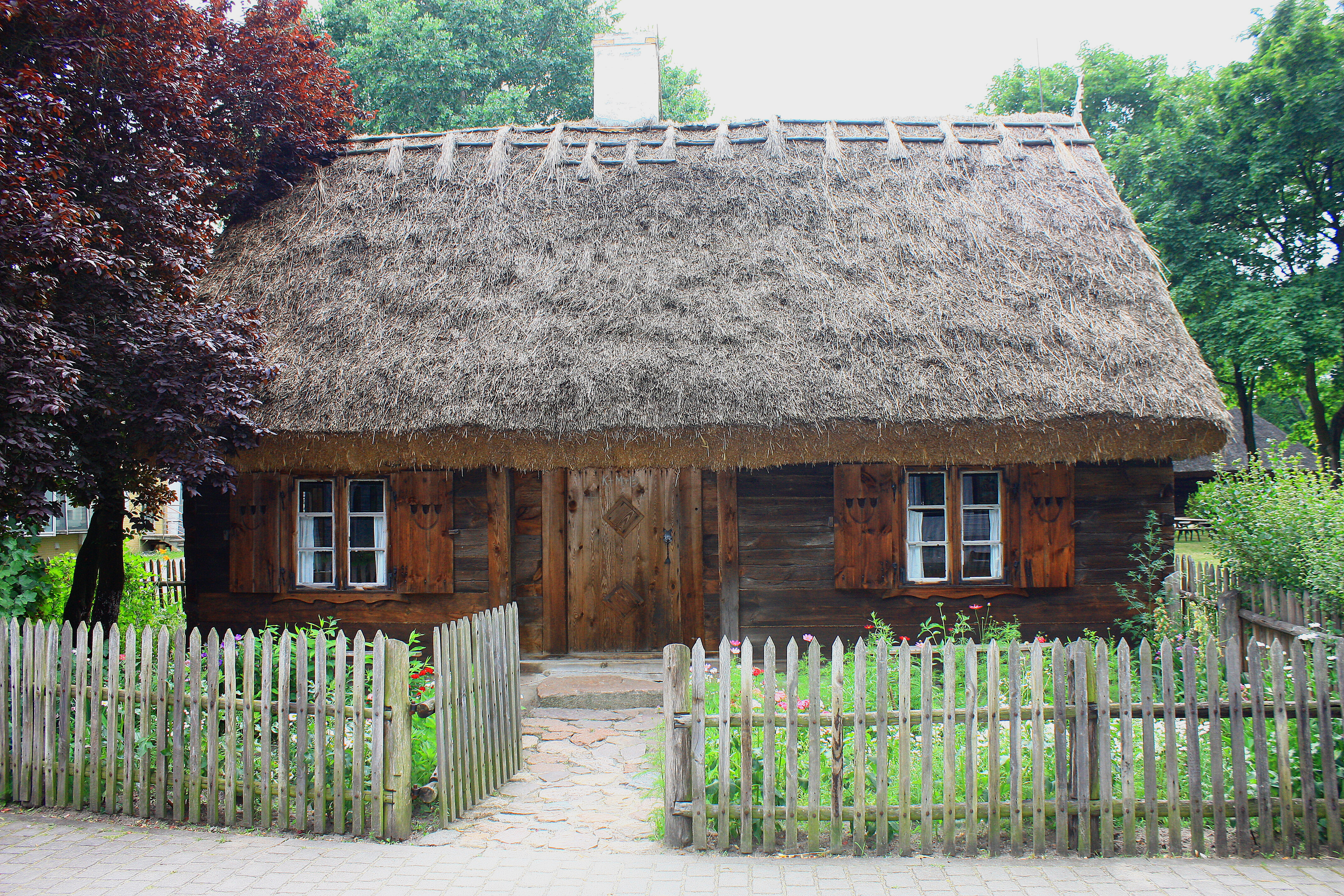
- A traditional house from Skórzenno, which is currently on display in the Toruń Ethnographic Museum

- Location within Poland
- Coordinates: 53°44′23″N 18°26′7″E
- Country: Poland
- Voivodeship: Pomeranian
- County: Starogard
- Gmina: Osiek
- Population: 230
- Time zone: UTC+1 (CET)
  - Summer (DST): UTC+2 (CEST)
- Vehicle registration: GST

Skórzenno [skuˈʐɛnnɔ] is a village in the administrative district of Gmina Osiek, within Starogard County, Pomeranian Voivodeship, in northern Poland. It is located in the ethnocultural region of Kociewie in the historic region of Pomerania.
