= Jeże, Pomeranian Voivodeship =

Village in Pomeranian Voivodeship, Poland

Jeże
- Settlement
- Location within Poland
- Coordinates: 53°44′51″N 18°10′19″E
- Country: Poland
- Voivodeship: Pomeranian
- County: Starogard
- Gmina: Osieczna
- Time zone: UTC+1 (CET)
  - Summer (DST): UTC+2 (CEST)
- Vehicle registration: GST

Jeże [ˈjɛʐɛ] is a settlement in the administrative district of Gmina Osieczna, within Starogard County, Pomeranian Voivodeship, in northern Poland. It is located within the ethnocultural region of Kociewie in the historic region of Pomerania.
