= Grabowiec, Gmina Osiek =

Village in Pomeranian Voivodeship, Poland

Grabowiec
- Settlement
- Location within Poland
- Coordinates: 53°54′20″N 18°35′54″E
- Country: Poland
- Voivodeship: Pomeranian
- County: Starogard
- Gmina: Osiek
- Time zone: UTC+1 (CET)
  - Summer (DST): UTC+2 (CEST)
- Vehicle registration: GST

Grabowiec [ɡraˈbɔvjɛt͡s] is a settlement in the administrative district of Gmina Osiek, within Starogard County, Pomeranian Voivodeship, in northern Poland. It is located within the ethnocultural region of Kociewie in the historic region of Pomerania.
