= Wierzbiny, Pomeranian Voivodeship =

Village in Pomeranian Voivodeship, Poland

Wierzbiny
- Village
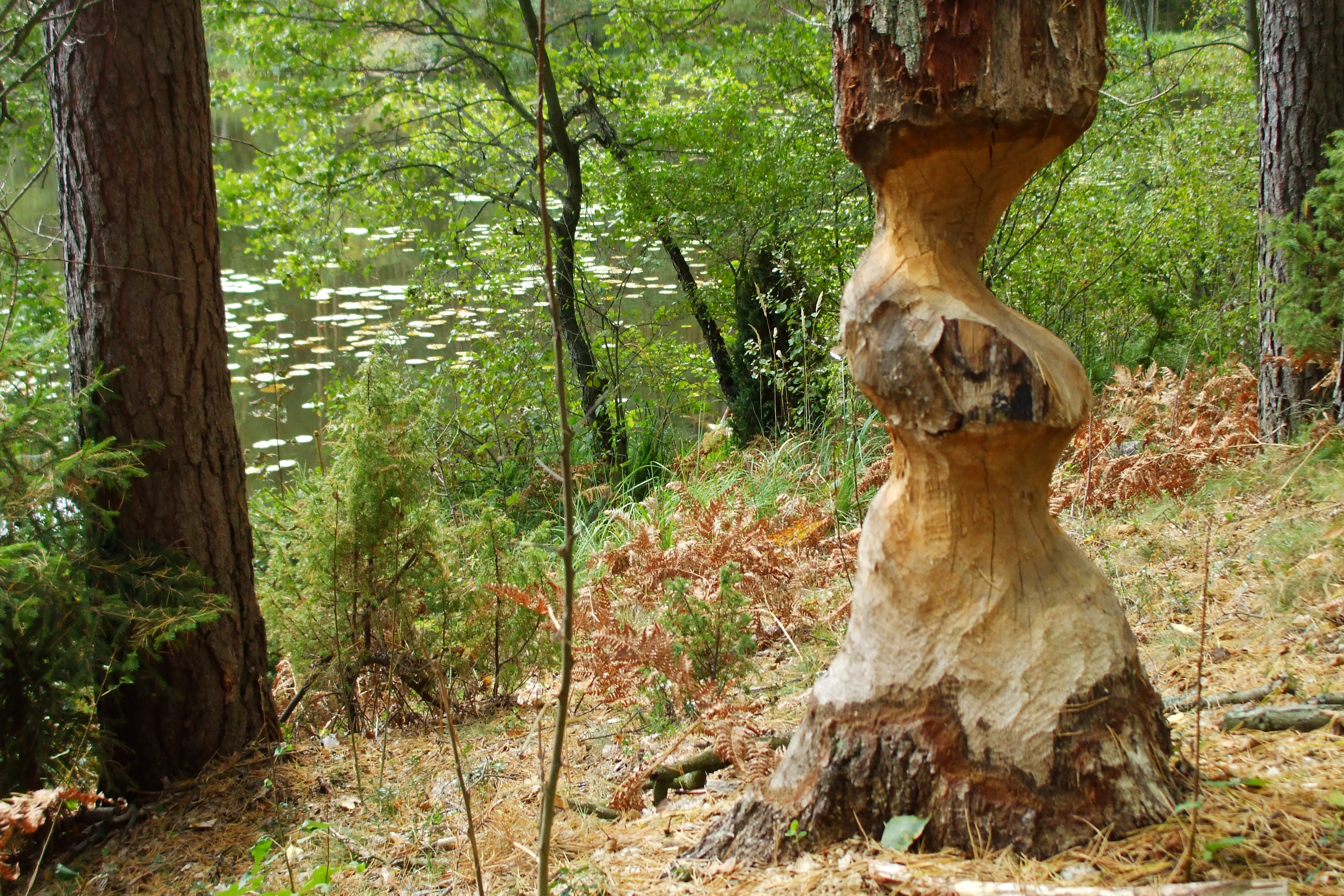

- Location within Poland
- Coordinates: 53°45′19″N 18°26′51″E
- Country: Poland
- Voivodeship: Pomeranian
- County: Starogard
- Gmina: Osiek
- Time zone: UTC+1 (CET)
  - Summer (DST): UTC+2 (CEST)
- Vehicle registration: GST

Wierzbiny [vjɛʐˈbinɨ] is a village in the administrative district of Gmina Osiek, within Starogard County, Pomeranian Voivodeship, in northern Poland. It is located in the ethnocultural region of Kociewie in the historic region of Pomerania.
