= Osieczna (disambiguation) =

Osieczna may refer to the following places in Poland:

- Osieczna, a town in Greater Poland Voivodeship (west Poland)
- Osieczna, Pomeranian Voivodeship (north Poland)
