= Trzebiechowo =

Trzebiechowo may refer to the following villages in Poland:

- Trzebiechowo, Pomeranian Voivodeship
- Trzebiechowo, West Pomeranian Voivodeship
