= Długolas =

Settlement in Kociewie

- Hamlet
- Location within Poland
- Coordinates: 53°42′29″N 18°32′41″E
- Country: Poland
- Voivodeship: Pomeranian
- County: Starogard
- Gmina: Osiek
- Time zone: UTC+1 (CET)
  - Summer (DST): UTC+2 (CEST)
- Postal code: 83-221
- SIMC: 0168343
- Vehicle registration: GST

Długolas [dwuˈɡɔlas] is a hamlet in the administrative district of Gmina Osiek, within Starogard County, Pomeranian Voivodeship, in northern Poland. It is located within the ethnocultural region of Kociewie.
