= Jasieniec, Pomeranian Voivodeship =

Village in Pomeranian Voivodeship, Poland

Jasieniec
- Settlement
- Location within Poland
- Coordinates: 53°41′7″N 18°30′58″E
- Country: Poland
- Voivodeship: Pomeranian
- County: Starogard
- Gmina: Osiek
- Time zone: UTC+1 (CET)
  - Summer (DST): UTC+2 (CEST)
- Vehicle registration: GST

Jasieniec [jaˈɕɛɲɛt͡s] is a settlement in the administrative district of Gmina Osiek, within Starogard County, Pomeranian Voivodeship, in northern Poland. It is located within the ethnocultural region of Kociewie in the historic region of Pomerania.
