= Cisowa Góra =

Settlement in Kociewie

- Hamlet
- Interactive map of Cisowa Góra
- Location within Poland
- Coordinates: 53°44′38″N 18°31′05″E
- Country: Poland
- Voivodeship: Pomeranian
- County: Starogard
- Gmina: Osiek
- Time zone: UTC+1 (CET)
  - Summer (DST): UTC+2 (CEST)
- Postal code: 83-221
- SIMC: 0168567
- Vehicle registration: GTC

Cisowa Góra is a hamlet in the administrative district of Gmina Osiek, within Starogard County, Pomeranian Voivodeship, in northern Poland. It is located in the ethnocultural region of Kociewie.
