= Markocin, Pomeranian Voivodeship =

Village in Pomeranian Voivodeship, Poland

Markocin
- Village
- Location within Poland
- Coordinates: 53°44′9″N 18°31′37″E
- Country: Poland
- Voivodeship: Pomeranian
- County: Starogard
- Gmina: Osiek

Population
  - Total: 40
- Time zone: UTC+1 (CET)
  - Summer (DST): UTC+2 (CEST)
- Vehicle registration: GST

Markocin [marˈkɔt͡ɕin] is a village in the administrative district of Gmina Osiek, within Starogard County, Pomeranian Voivodeship, in northern Poland. It is located within the ethnocultural region of Kociewie in the historic region of Pomerania.
