= Łuby =

Łuby may refer to:

- Łuby, Lublin Voivodeship, Poland
- Łuby, Pomeranian Voivodeship, Poland
