= Bałkany =

Village in Pomeranian Voivodeship, Poland

- Przysiółek
- Location within Poland
- Coordinates: 53°49′1″N 18°9′27″E
- Country: Poland
- Voivodeship: Pomeranian
- County: Starogard
- Gmina: Osieczna
- Time zone: UTC+1 (CET)
  - Summer (DST): UTC+2 (CEST)
- Vehicle registration: GST

Bałkany [bau̯ˈkanɨ] is a przysiółek in the administrative district of Gmina Osieczna, within Starogard County, Pomeranian Voivodeship, in northern Poland. It is located in the ethnocultural region of Kociewie in the historic region of Pomerania.
