= Gmina Osiek, Pomeranian Voivodeship =

Gmina Osiek Osiek Commune
- Gmina
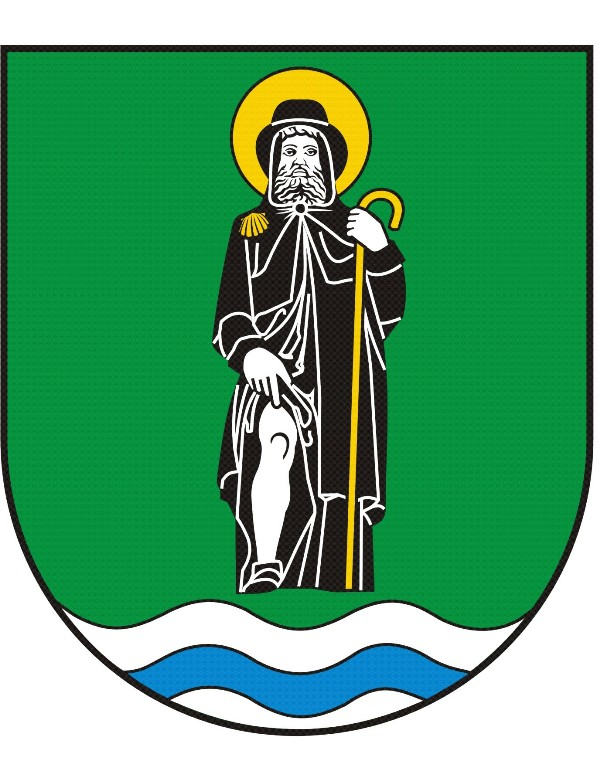
- Coat of arms
- Interactive map of Gmina Osiek
- Coordinates (Osiek): 53°43′19″N 18°29′27″E
- Country: Poland
- Voivodeship: Pomeranian
- County: Starogard
- Seat: Osiek

Area
  - Total: 155.63 km^{2} (60.09 sq mi)

Population (2006)
  - Total: 2,416
  - Density: 15.52/km^{2} (40.21/sq mi)
- Website: http://www.osiek.gda.pl/

Gmina Osiek is a rural gmina (administrative district) in Starogard County, Pomeranian Voivodeship, in northern Poland. Its seat is the village of Osiek, which lies approximately 28 kilometres (17 mi) south of Starogard Gdański and 73 km (45 mi) south of the regional capital Gdańsk.

The gmina covers an area of 155.63 square kilometres (60.1 sq mi), and as of 2006 its total population is 2,416.

== Villages ==
Gmina Osiek contains the villages and settlements of Błędno, Bukowiny, Cisowa Góra, Cisowy, Dębia Góra, Długolas, Dobry Brat, Frąca, Gęby, Głuche, Grabowiec, Jasieniec, Jaszczerek, Jaszczerz, Jeżewnica, Kałębnica, Karszanek, Kasparus, Komorze, Lisówko, Łuby, Markocin, Okarpiec, Osiek, Osiek-Pole, Piecki, Pieczyska, Radogoszcz, Recice, Skórzenno, Skrzynia, Suchobrzeźnica, Szlaga-Młyn, Trzebiechowo, Udzierz, Wierzbiny, Wycinki, Wycinki Małe, Wymysłowo, Zdrójki and Żurawki.

== Neighbouring gminas ==
Gmina Osiek is bordered by the town of Skórcz and by the gminas of Lubichowo, Nowe, Osie, Osieczna, Skórcz, Śliwice, Smętowo Graniczne and Warlubie.
