= Osiek, Starogard County =

Village in Pomeranian Voivodeship, Poland

Osiek
- Village
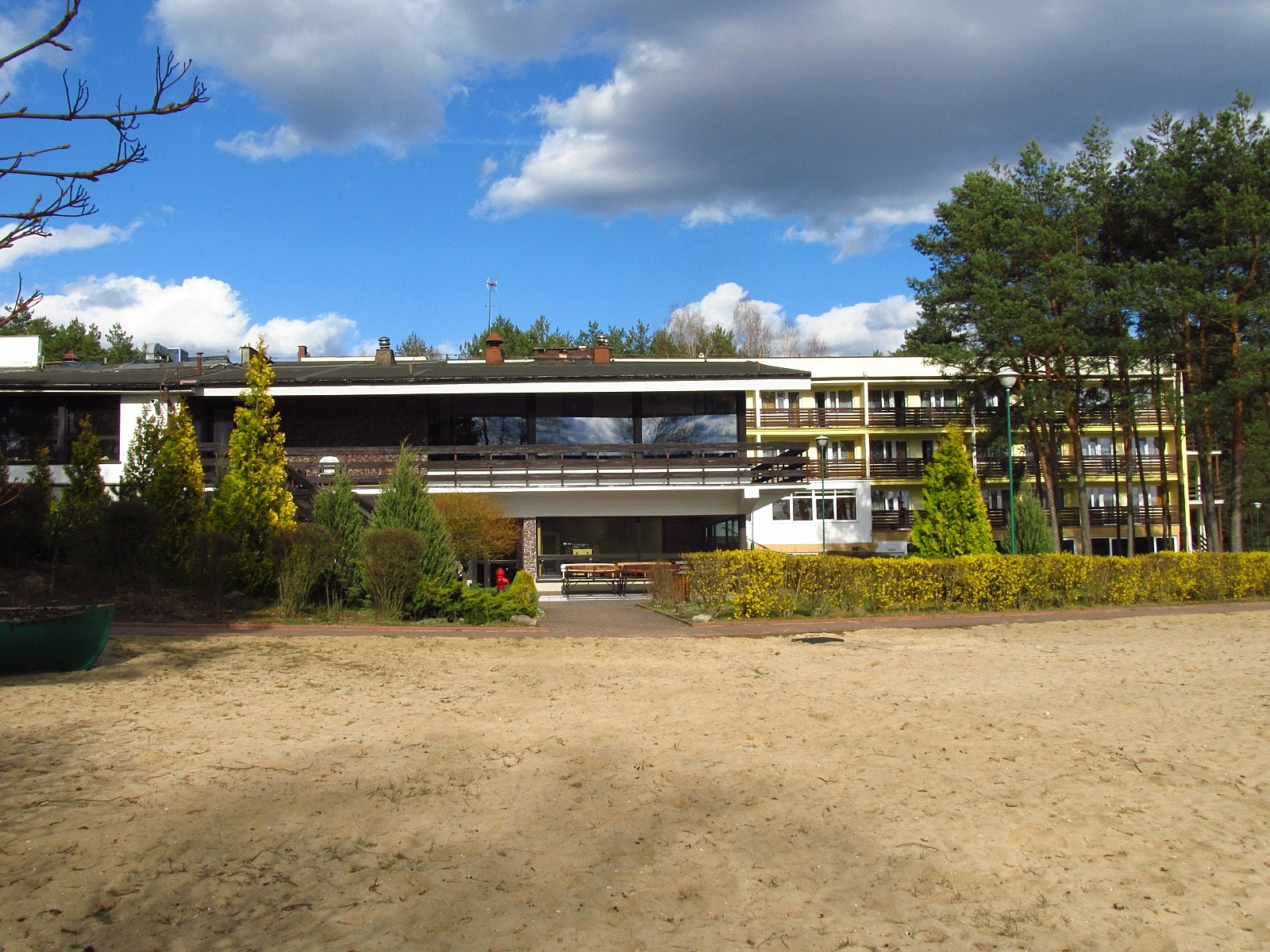
- The modernist sanatorium in Osiek

- Location within Poland
- Coordinates: 53°43′19″N 18°29′27″E
- Country: Poland
- Voivodeship: Pomeranian
- County: Starogard
- Gmina: Osiek

Government
  - Wójt: Janusz Kaczyński
- Population: 1,012
- Time zone: UTC+1 (CET)
  - Summer (DST): UTC+2 (CEST)
- Vehicle registration: GST
- Website: http://www.osiek.gda.pl

Osiek [ˈɔɕɛk] is a village in Starogard County, Pomeranian Voivodeship, in northern Poland. It is the seat of the gmina (administrative district) called Gmina Osiek. It is located in the ethnocultural region of Kociewie in the historic region of Pomerania.
