= Trzebiechowo, Pomeranian Voivodeship =

Village in Pomeranian Voivodeship, Poland

Trzebiechowo
- Settlement
- Location within Poland
- Coordinates: 53°42′25″N 18°25′33″E
- Country: Poland
- Voivodeship: Pomeranian
- County: Starogard
- Gmina: Osiek

Population
  - Total: 32
- Time zone: UTC+1 (CET)
  - Summer (DST): UTC+2 (CEST)
- Vehicle registration: GST

Trzebiechowo [tʂɛbjɛˈxɔvɔ] is a settlement in the administrative district of Gmina Osiek, within Starogard County, Pomeranian Voivodeship, in northern Poland. It is located in the ethnocultural region of Kociewie in the historic region of Pomerania.

The settlement has an oceanic (Cfb) climate.
