= Balkany (surname) =

Balkany is a surname. Notable people with the surname include:

- Isabelle Balkany, French politician
- Julien Balkany (born 1981), French businessman and investor
- Milton Balkany (born 1946), American Orthodox rabbi
- Patrick Balkany (born 1948), French politician
- Thomas J. Balkany (1948–2025), American ear surgeon, otolaryngologist, and neurotologist
