= Fracas =

Fracas may refer to:

- Fracas! Improv Festival, an improvisational theater festival held at the University of Southern California
- Failure Reporting, Analysis and Corrective Action Systems
- Fracas (video game), a 1980 Apple II video game by Stuart Smith
