= Gmina Osieczna, Pomeranian Voivodeship =

Gmina Osieczna Osieczna Commune
- Gmina
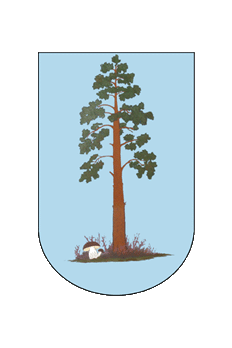
- Coat of arms
- Interactive map of Gmina Osieczna
- Coordinates (Osieczna): 53°46′17″N 18°12′18″E
- Country: Poland
- Voivodeship: Pomeranian
- County: Starogard
- Seat: Osieczna

Area
  - Total: 123.26 km^{2} (47.59 sq mi)

Population (2022)
  - Total: 2,839
  - Density: 23.03/km^{2} (59.65/sq mi)
- Website: http://kociewiak.pl/gminy/osieczna/index.php

Gmina Osieczna is a rural gmina (administrative district) in Starogard County, Pomeranian Voivodeship, in northern Poland. Its seat is the village of Osieczna, which lies approximately 31 kilometres (19 mi) south-west of Starogard Gdański and 72 km (45 mi) south-west of the regional capital Gdańsk.

The gmina covers an area of 123.26 square kilometres (47.6 sq mi), and as of 2022 its total population is 2,839.

== Villages ==
Gmina Osieczna contains the villages and settlements of Bałkany, Cisiny, Długie, Duże Krówno, Jastrzębie, Jeże, Klaniny, Leśny Dwór, Małe Krówno, Nowy Dwór, Osieczna, Osówek, Owcze Błota, Parcele, Pólka, Starzyska, Szlachta, Wiązak, Zdrójno and Zimne Zdroje.

== Neighbouring gminas ==
Gmina Osieczna is bordered by the town of Czarna Woda and by the gminas of Czersk, Kaliska, Lubichowo, Osiek and Śliwice.
