= Osieczna, Pomeranian Voivodeship =

Village in Pomeranian Voivodeship, Poland

Osieczna
- Village
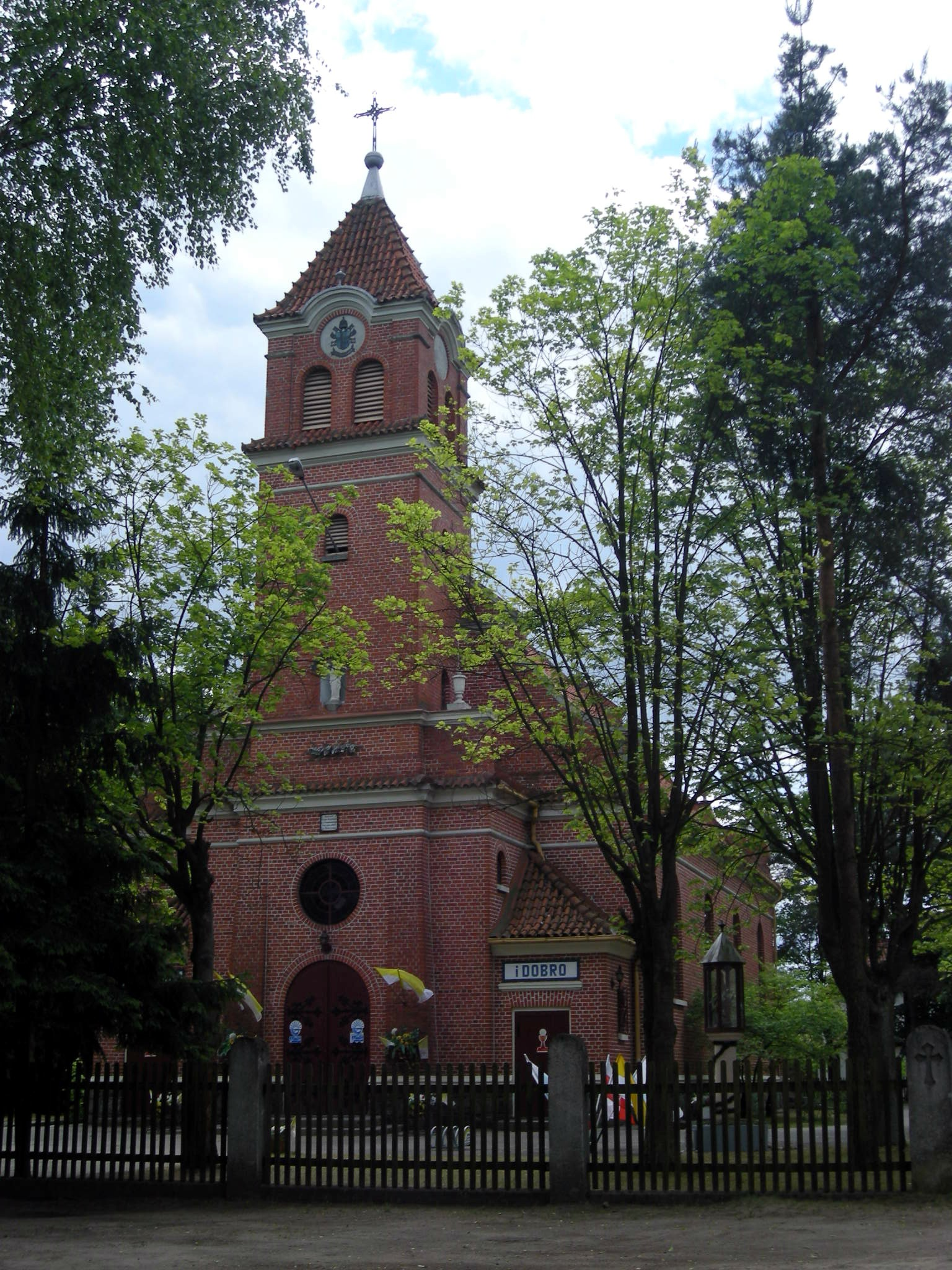
- Immaculate Conception church in Osieczna

- Location within Poland
- Coordinates: 53°46′17″N 18°12′18″E
- Country: Poland
- Voivodeship: Pomeranian
- County: Starogard
- Gmina: Osieczna
- First mentioned: 1664

Population (2022)
  - Total: 855
- Time zone: UTC+1 (CET)
  - Summer (DST): UTC+2 (CEST)
- Vehicle registration: GST

Osieczna [ɔˈɕɛt͡ʂna] (German: Hagenort) is a village in Starogard County, Pomeranian Voivodeship, in northern Poland. It is the seat of the gmina (administrative district) called Gmina Osieczna. It is located in the ethnocultural region of Kociewie in the historic region of Pomerania.

== History ==
Following the German-Soviet invasion of Poland, which started World War II in September 1939, Osieczna was occupied by Germany until 1945. Osieczna was one of the sites of executions of Poles, carried out by the Germans in 1939 as part of the Intelligenzaktion. A local Polish policeman was murdered by the Russians in the Katyn massacre in 1940. The German occupation ended in 1945, and the village was restored to Poland, although with a Soviet-installed communist regime, which stayed in power until the Fall of Communism in the 1980s. In the following years, the Polish anti-communist resistance was active in Osieczna, and it even raided a local communist police station.
