= Starogard County =

Starogard County Powiat starogardzki
- County
- Flag Coat of arms

- Division into gminas
- Coordinates (Starogard Gdański): 53°58′N 18°32′E
- Country: Poland
- Voivodeship: Pomeranian
- Seat: Starogard Gdański
- Gminas: Total 13 (incl. 3 urban): Czarna Woda; Skórcz; Starogard Gdański; Gmina Bobowo; Gmina Kaliska; Gmina Lubichowo; Gmina Osieczna; Gmina Osiek; Gmina Skarszewy; Gmina Skórcz; Gmina Smętowo Graniczne; Gmina Starogard Gdański; Gmina Zblewo

Area
  - Total: 1,345.28 km^{2} (519.42 sq mi)

Population (2019)
  - Total: 127,676
  - Density: 94.9066/km^{2} (245.807/sq mi)
  - Urban: 61,180
  - Rural: 66,496
- Car plates: GST
- Website: www.powiatstarogard.pl

Starogard County (Polish: powiat starogardzki, Kashubian: Starogarda kréj) is a unit of territorial administration and local government (powiat) in Pomeranian Voivodeship, northern Poland. The name is a combination of two terms: stari which is Slavic for old and gard which is Pomeranian language stands for town, city, fortified settlement. In this meaning, the term gard (also spelled as gôrd) is still being used in the only surviving dialect of the Pomeranian, Kashubian language. The county came into being on January 1, 1999, as a result of the Polish local government reforms passed in 1998. Its administrative seat and largest town is Starogard Gdański, which lies 45 kilometres (28 mi) south of the regional capital Gdańsk. The county contains three other towns: Skarszewy, 13 km (8 mi) north-west of Starogard Gdański, Skórcz, 19 km (12 mi) south of Starogard Gdański, and Czarna Woda, 33 km (21 mi) south-west of Starogard Gdański. Starogard County is part of the area traditionally inhabited by the Kociewiacy ethnic group.

The county covers an area of 1,345.28 square kilometres (519.4 sq mi). As of 2019 its total population is 127,676, out of which the population of Starogard Gdański is 47,775, that of Skarszewy is 6,994, that of Skórcz is 3,625, that of Czarna Woda is 2,786, and the rural population is 66,496.

Starogard County on a map of the counties of Pomeranian Voivodeship

Starogard County is bordered by Gdańsk County to the north, Tczew County to the east, Świecie County to the south, Tuchola County to the south-west, and Chojnice County and Kościerzyna County to the west.

== Administrative divisions ==
The county is subdivided into 13 gminas (three urban, one urban-rural and nine rural). These are listed in the following table, in descending order of population.

Gmina	Type	Area (km^{2})	Population (2019)	Seat
Starogard Gdański	urban	25.3	47,775	
Gmina Starogard Gdański	rural	196.2	16,614	Starogard Gdański *
Gmina Skarszewy	urban-rural	169.8	14,799	Skarszewy
Gmina Zblewo	rural	138.0	11,748	Zblewo
Gmina Lubichowo	rural	161.0	6,636	Lubichowo
Gmina Kaliska	rural	110.4	5,439	Kaliska
Gmina Smętowo Graniczne	rural	86.1	5,203	Smętowo Graniczne
Gmina Skórcz	rural	96.6	4,585	Skórcz *
Skórcz	urban	3.7	3,625	
Gmina Bobowo	rural	51.7	3,188	Bobowo
Gmina Osieczna	rural	123.3	2,897	Osieczna
Czarna Woda	urban	27.8	2,786	
Gmina Osiek	rural	155.6	2,381	Osiek
* seat not part of the gmina
