= Kreis Preußisch Stargard =

Former district of Prussia

- District of Prussia
- 1772–1920
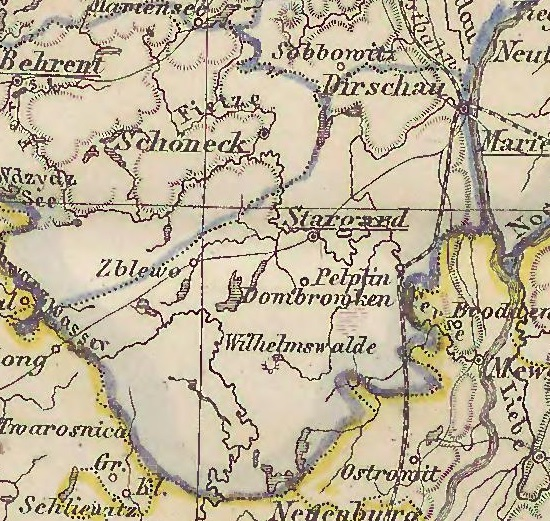
- Map of the Kreise by Max Toeppen, 1858
- Capital: Preußisch Stargard (Starogard Gdański)
- History
  - Established: 1772
  - Disestablished: 1920
- Today part of: Poland

The Preußisch Stargard district was a Prussian district that existed from 1772 to 1920 with varying borders. It was in the part of West Prussia that fell to Poland after World War I through the Treaty of Versailles in 1920. Its county seat was Preußisch Stargard. From 1939 to 1945 the district was re-established in German-occupied Poland as part of the newly established Reichsgau Danzig-West Prussia. Today the territory of the district is located in the Polish Pomeranian Voivodeship.

== History ==
With the First Partition of Poland, the area of the Preußisch Stargard district was annexed by the Kingdom of Prussia in 1772 and became part of the newly formed province of West Prussia, which was divided into six large districts, including the Stargard district. On 30 April 1815 the district became part of Regierungsbezirk Danzig in the province of West Prussia. As part of a comprehensive district reform, a new, smaller Preußisch Stargard district was formed on 1 April 1818, containing the towns of Dirschau and Preußisch Stargard. The district office was in Preußisch Stargard.

From 3 December 1829 to 1 April 1878 the provinces of West Prussia and East Prussia were united to form the Province of Prussia, which had belonged to the German Reich since 1871. The continuous population growth in the 19th century necessitated a district reform in West Prussia. So, on 1 October 1887, the new Dirschau district was created from the northern part of the Preußisch Stargard district, which included the town of Dirschau and its surrounding area.

Due to the provisions of the Versailles Treaty, the Preußisch Stargard district had to be ceded by Germany to Poland on 10 January 1920.

== Demographics ==
Ethnolinguistic structure of Kreis Preußisch Stargard
Year	Population	German		Polish / Bilingual / Other	
1905	62,465	17,425	27.9%	45,040	72.1%
1910	65,427	17,165	26.2%	48,262	73.8%

== Politics ==
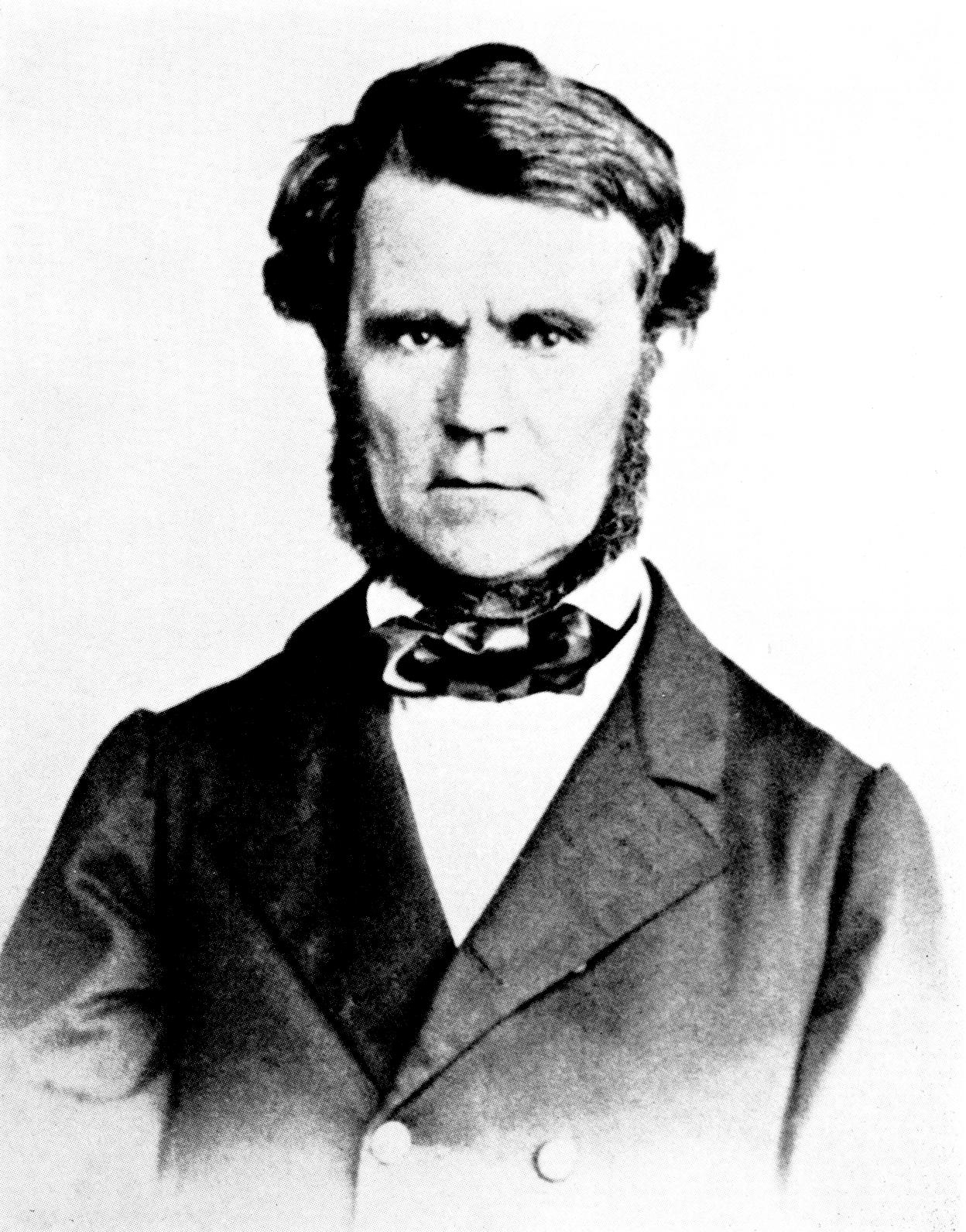
Portrait of Anton Rothe, the district administrator of the Kreise from 1872-1875

=== District administrators ===
- 1850–1851:Bruno von Schrötter
- 1851–1872:Karl von Neefe
- 1872–1875:Anton Rothe
- 1875–1887:Axel Döhn
- 1887–1908:Franz Hagen
- 1908–1911:Konrad Schulte-Heuthaus
- 1911–1919:Leopold Wiesner

=== Elections ===
In the German Empire, the Preußisch Stargard and Berent districts formed the Danzig 5 Reichstag constituency within the boundaries of 1871. This constituency was won by candidates from the Polish Party in all elections to the Reichstag between 1871 and 1912:

- 1871:Michael von Kalkstein
- 1874:Michael von Kalkstein
- 1877:Adam von Sierakowski
- 1878:Adam von Sierakowski
- 1881:Michael von Kalkstein
- 1884:Michael von Kalkstein
- 1887:Michael von Kalkstein
- 1890:Boleslaw von Kossowski
- 1893:Michael von Kalkstein
- 1898:Anton Neubauer
- 1903:Wladislaus von Wolszlegier
- 1907:Jan Brejski
- 1912:Petrus Dunajski

== Municipalities ==
In 1910, the Preußisch Stargard district comprised the town of Preußisch Stargard and 76 rural communities:

- Barchnau
- Barloschno
- Birkenfließ
- Bitonia
- Bobau
- Bordzichow
- Bresnow
- Czarnen
- Deutsch Semlin
- Dombrowken
- Dreidorf
- Forsteck
- Gentomie
- Gonsiorken
- Grabau
- Grabowitz
- Groß Bialachowo
- Groß Bukowitz
- Groß Semlin
- Hagenort
- Hoch Stüblau
- Hütte
- Iwitzno
- Kaltspring
- Karlshagen
- Karschenken
- Kasparus
- Klanin
- Klein Bukowitz
- Klein Jablau
- Kollenzdorf
- Königswalde
- Kottisch
- Krangen
- Krowno
- Kulitz
- Labuhnken
- Lienfitz
- Lippinken
- Lubichow
- Lubicki
- Miritz
- Mirotken
- Morroschin
- Moschiska
- Neukirch
- Occipel
- Ofen
- Okollen
- Ossiek
- Ossoweg
- Ossowo
- Pinschin
- Ponschau
- Preußisch Stargard, town
- Radegast
- Resenschin
- Riewalde
- Romberg
- Rosenthal
- Saaben
- Schlachta
- Schwarzwald
- Schwarzwasser
- Skurz
- Studzenitz
- Walddorf
- Wda
- Wieck
- Wielbrandowo
- Wiesenwald
- Wilscheblott
- Wittschinken
- Wollenthal
- Wolsche
- Zdroino
- Zellgosch

== Landkreis Preußisch Stargard in occupied Poland (1939–1945) ==
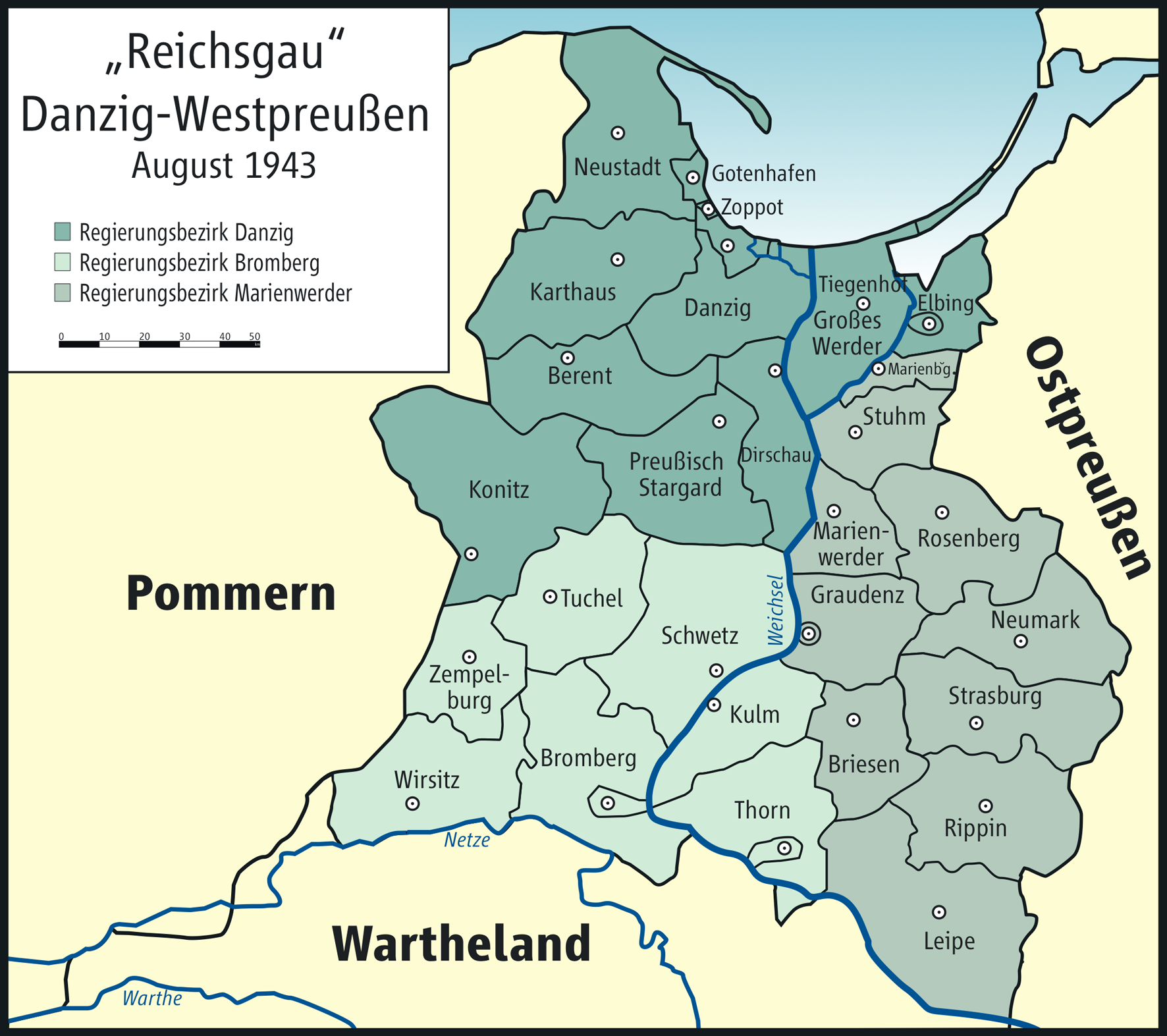
Reichsgau Danzig-West Prussia (1943)

=== History ===
After the German invasion of Poland and the subsequent annexation of the district area by Nazi Germany, the district was re-established under the name Landkreis Preußisch Stargard in the newly established Reichsgau Danzig-West Prussia from 1939 to 1945. The towns of Großwollental (Skórcz) and Preußisch Stargard were subject to the German municipal code of 30 January 1935, which was valid in the Altreich and provided for the enforcement of the Führerprinzip at the municipal level.

The Germans immediately carried out mass arrests of Polish teachers, priests and local activists in Starogard and county as part of the Intelligenzaktion. Arrested Poles were then held both in the pre-war prison and the medieval Gdańsk Tower in Starogard and often subjected to brutal beatings and mistreatment, especially clergymen, some of whom had even swastikas cut into their foreheads. Already in September 1939, the Germans murdered 150 Poles, including inhabitants of Starogard, Skórcz and Gdynia, in Starogard and its vicinity.

In the spring of 1945, the Soviet Red Army captured the district after which it was restored to Poland. In the following years, the remaining German population was expelled.

=== Place names ===
By an unpublished decree of 29 December 1939 the German place names valid until 1918 were provisionally valid in the district. By an order of the Reich Governor in Danzig-West Prussia on 25 June 1942, all place names were Germanized with the consent of the Reich Minister of the Interior. Either the name from 1918 was retained or - if "not German enough" - acoustically adjusted or translated, for example:

- Adlig Lippinken: Adliglinde
- Barloschno: Schenkenberg
- Dombrowken: Damerau
- Groß Jablau: Großgabel
- Lesnian: Waldjahn
- Lubichow: Liebichau
- Osiek: Burgfelde
- Schlachta: Edelwalde
- Skorschenno: Wurzelacker
- Skurz: Großwollental

== Bibliography ==
- Wardzyńska, Maria (2009). Był rok 1939. Operacja niemieckiej policji bezpieczeństwa w Polsce. Intelligenzaktion (in Polish). Warszawa: IPN.
