= Gmina Skórcz =

Gmina Skórcz Skórcz Commune
- Gmina
- Coat of arms
- Interactive map of Gmina Skórcz
- Coordinates (Skórcz): 53°47′48″N 18°31′34″E
- Country: Poland
- Voivodeship: Pomeranian
- County: Starogard
- Seat: Skórcz

Government
  - Wójt: Sławomir Czechowski

Area
  - Total: 96.63 km^{2} (37.31 sq mi)

Population (2006)
  - Total: 4,567
  - Density: 47.26/km^{2} (122.4/sq mi)
- Website: https://gminaskorcz.pl/

Gmina Skórcz is a rural gmina (administrative district) in Starogard County, Pomeranian Voivodeship, in northern Poland. Its seat is the town of Skórcz, although the town is not part of the territory of the gmina.

The gmina covers an area of 96.63 square kilometres (37.3 sq mi), and as of 2006 its total population is 4,567.

== Villages ==
Gmina Skórcz contains the villages and settlements of Barłożno, Bojanowo, Boraszewo, Bukowiec Nowy, Czarne, Czarnylas, Drewniaczki, Kranek Drugi, Mieliczki, Mirotki, Miryce, Nowy Bukowiec, Pączewo, Pólko, Pustkowie, Ryzowie, Skórcz-Kranek, Wielbrandowo, Wielki Bukowiec, Wolental, Wybudowanie Wielbrandowskie and Zajączek.

== Neighbouring gminas ==
Gmina Skórcz is bordered by the town of Skórcz and by the gminas of Bobowo, Lubichowo, Morzeszczyn, Osiek and Smętowo Graniczne.
