= Mysinek =

Village in Pomeranian Voivodeship, Poland

- Settlement
- Location within Poland
- Coordinates: 53°55′4″N 18°37′11″E
- Country: Poland
- Voivodeship: Pomeranian
- County: Starogard
- Gmina: Bobowo

Population (2022)
  - Total: 5
- Time zone: UTC+1 (CET)
  - Summer (DST): UTC+2 (CEST)
- Postal code: 83-212
- Vehicle registration: GST

Mysinek [mɨˈɕinɛk] is a settlement in the administrative district of Gmina Bobowo, within Starogard County, Pomeranian Voivodeship, in northern Poland. It is located within the ethnocultural region of Kociewie in the historic region of Pomerania.
