= Wybudowanie Wielbrandowskie =

Village in Pomeranian Voivodeship, Poland

- Village
- Location within Poland
- Coordinates: 53°48′39″N 18°32′28″E
- Country: Poland
- Voivodeship: Pomeranian
- County: Starogard
- Gmina: Skórcz
- Time zone: UTC+1 (CET)
  - Summer (DST): UTC+2 (CEST)
- Vehicle registration: GST

Wybudowanie Wielbrandowskie [vɨbudɔˈvaɲɛ vjɛlbranˈdɔfskʲɛ] is a village in the administrative district of Gmina Skórcz, within Starogard County, Pomeranian Voivodeship, in northern Poland. It is located in the ethnocultural region of Kociewie in the historic region of Pomerania.
