= Wolental =

Village in Pomeranian Voivodeship, Poland

- Village
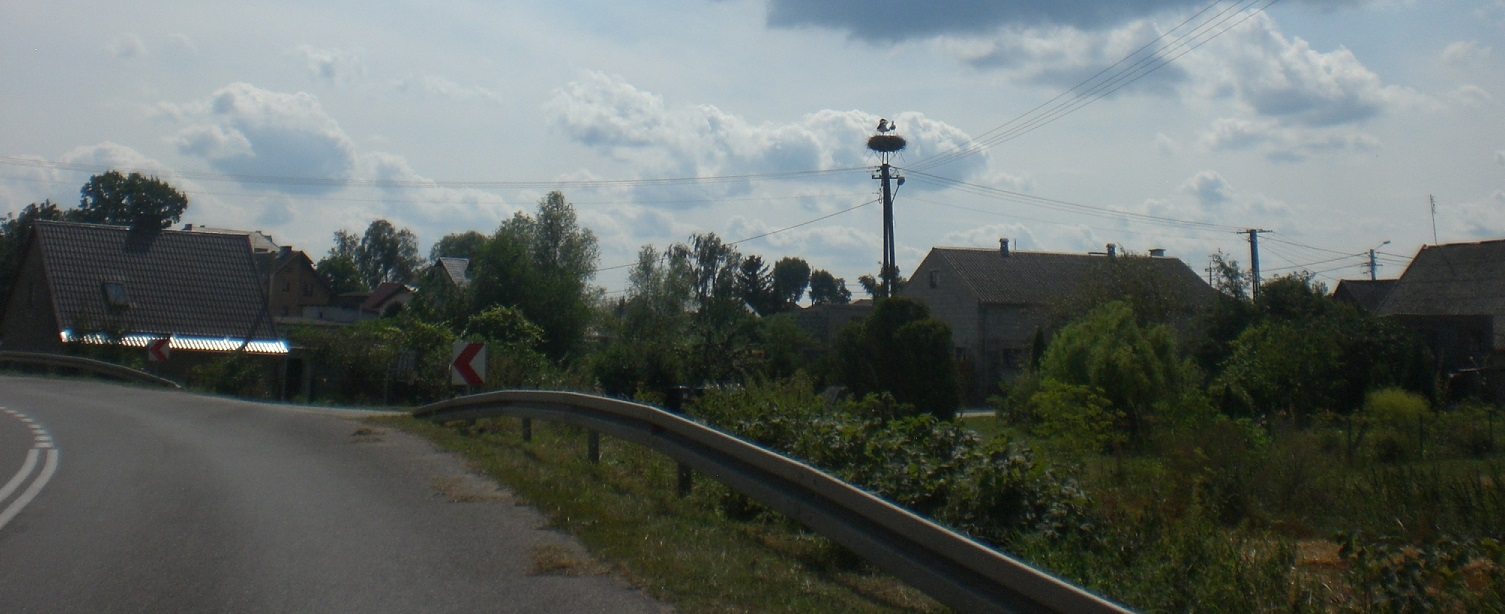

- Location within Poland
- Coordinates: 53°49′36″N 18°31′55″E
- Country: Poland
- Voivodeship: Pomeranian
- County: Starogard
- Gmina: Skórcz

Population
  - Total: 560
- Time zone: UTC+1 (CET)
  - Summer (DST): UTC+2 (CEST)
- Vehicle registration: GST

Wolental [vɔˈlɛntal] is a village in the administrative district of Gmina Skórcz, within Starogard County, Pomeranian Voivodeship, in northern Poland. It is located within the ethnocultural region of Kociewie in the historic region of Pomerania.

== History ==
Wolental was a royal village of the Kingdom of Poland, administratively located in the Tczew County in the Pomeranian Voivodeship.

During the German occupation of Poland (World War II), several Poles from Wolental were murdered by the Germans in the Zajączek forest nearby in 1939 (see Intelligenzaktion), and 55 Poles were expelled in 1943–1944, and their farms were handed over to German colonists as part of the Lebensraum policy.
