= Pączewo =

Village in Pomeranian Voivodeship, Poland

- Village
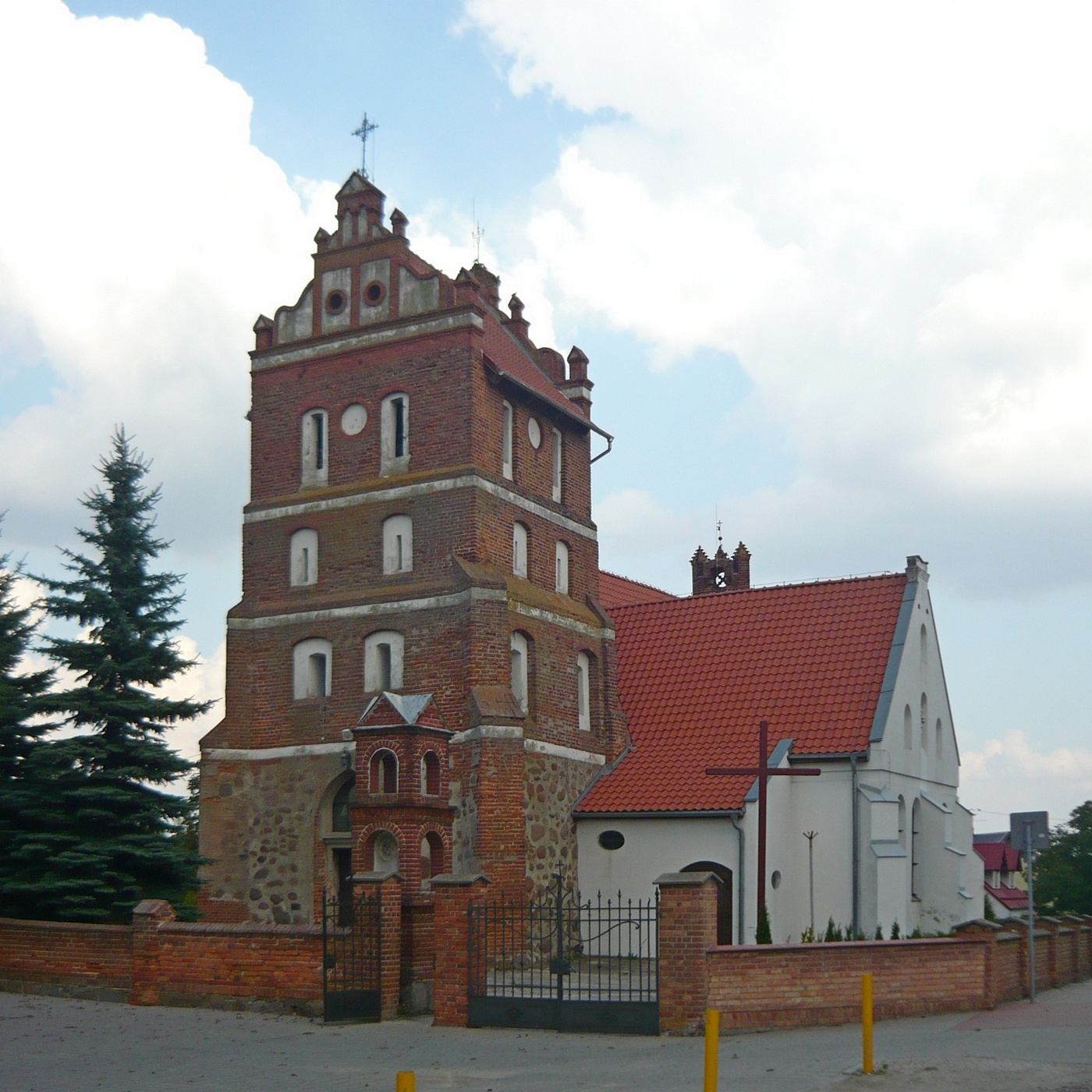
- Church of the Annunciation in Pączewo

- Location within Poland
- Coordinates: 53°50′51″N 18°31′56″E
- Country: Poland
- Voivodeship: Pomeranian
- County: Starogard
- Gmina: Skórcz
- Population: 685
- Time zone: UTC+1 (CET)
  - Summer (DST): UTC+2 (CEST)
- Vehicle registration: GST

Pączewo [pɔnˈt͡ʂɛvɔ] is a village in the administrative district of Gmina Skórcz, within Starogard County, Pomeranian Voivodeship, in northern Poland. It is located within the ethnocultural region of Kociewie in the historic region of Pomerania.

The landmark of Pączewo is the historic Church of the Annunciation.

== History ==
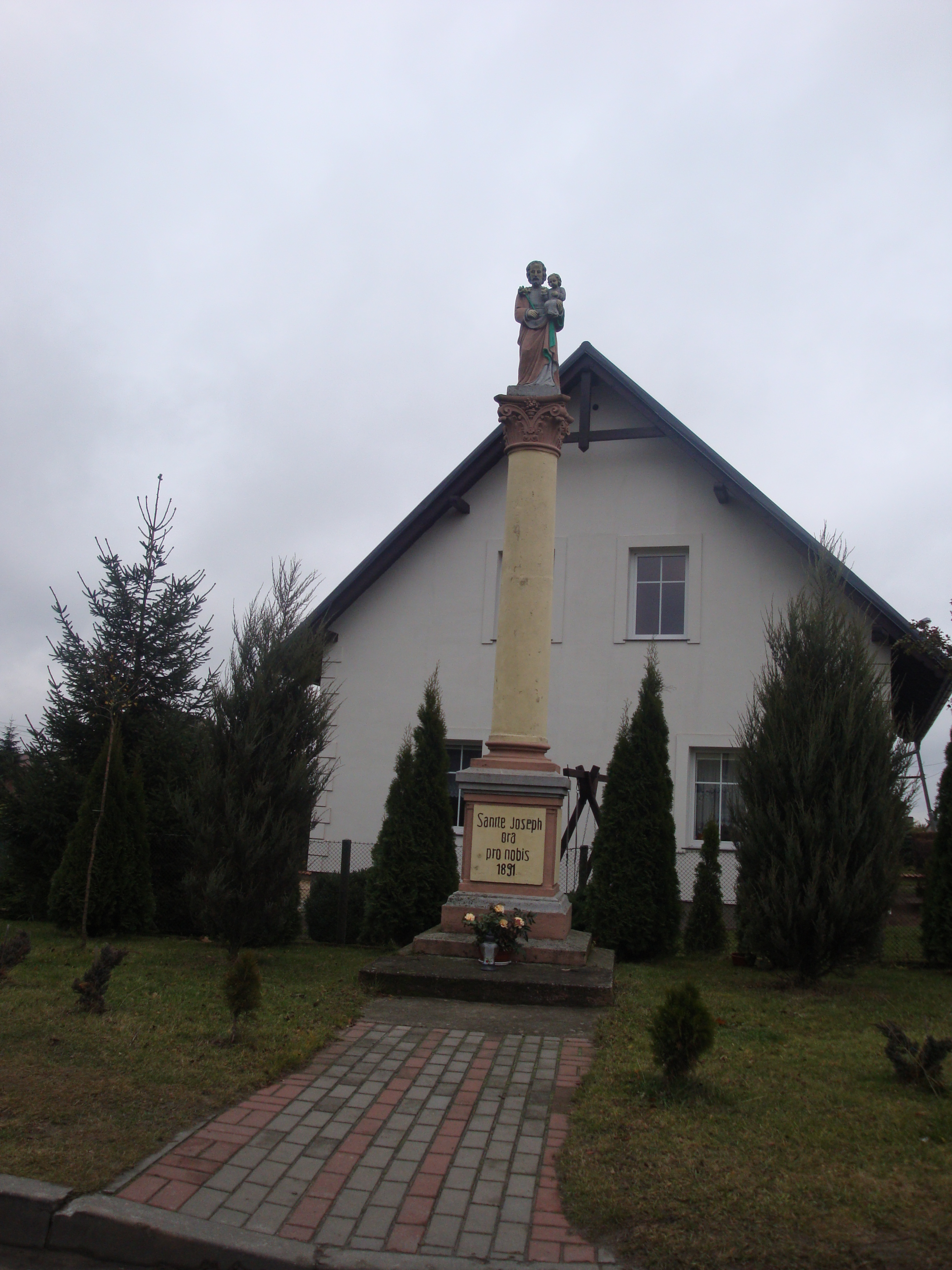
19th-century St. Joseph's column

The oldest known mention of the village dates back to 1352. It was destroyed during the Thirteen Years' War (1454–1466), and later rebuilt. Pączewo was a royal village of the Polish Crown, administratively located in the Tczew County in the Pomeranian Voivodeship. In 1673 it was granted a royal privilege).

During the German occupation of Poland (World War II), several Poles from Pączewo were murdered by the Germans in the Zajączek forest nearby in 1939 (see Intelligenzaktion), and several dozens of Polish families were expelled in 1940 and 1942 and deported either to the General Government or to forced labour to Germany, while their farms were handed over to German colonists as part of the Lebensraum policy.

== Notable people ==
- Jan Brejski (1863–1934), Polish activist, journalist, publisher, and member of the Legislative Sejm
