= Bronisław Komorowski (priest) =

Polish Roman Catholic priest and martyr

- Father Bronisław Komorowski
- Born: 25 May 1889; Barloschno, German Empire (present day Barłożno, Poland)
- Died: 22 March 1940 (aged 50); Stutthof, Nazi Germany (present day Sztutowo, Poland)
- Occupation: Polish priest

Bronisław Komorowski (25 May 1889 – 22 March 1940) was a Polish Roman Catholic priest, active in the interwar period in the predominantly German Free City of Danzig. Komorowski, a Polish patriot and educator, was murdered by the Nazi occupiers at Stutthof concentration camp, together with a number of Polish activists captured during the Polish September Campaign. On 13 June 1999, Komorowski was among 108 Polish martyrs of World War II, beatified in Warsaw by Pope John Paul II.

== Youth ==
Komorowski was born in Barloschno (today known as Barłożno), a village located some 65 kilometers south of Danzig (Gdańsk). His parents were Jan Komorowski (1840–1892) and Katarzyna née Gencza (1859–1925). The father, who was a widower with seven children, after the death of his first wife, Joanna Dluzewska, married Gencza in 1888, a widow with one child. They had three children – Bronisław, Wacław (1890–1891), and Anna (1892-?).

In 1892, after the death of Jan Komorowski, Katarzyna married a wealthy farmer Jan Fankidejski (1866–1934), with whom she had three more children. Bronisław Komorowski was raised with the Fankidejski family, and among his stepfather's friends, there were local Polish activists of Eastern Pomerania, patriotic Roman Catholic priests, Jakub Fankidejski (1844–1883), who also was a historian and teacher at Collegium Marianum in Pelplin, and Feliks Bolt (1864–1940), who became a senator in the Second Polish Republic. Komorowski attended a high school in Culm, and after graduation (1910), he joined a seminary in Pelplin. He was ordained in 1914, and sent to a parish in the village of Langenau, near Praust.

== Priesthood ==
In 1915, he was transferred from Langenau to St. Nicolaus, one of the oldest churches in Danzig. The young vicar, apart from his church activities, helped Polish community of the city, teaching the children Polish history and Polish language. Since 1919, all his sermons were in Polish. In 1923, together with a group of activists, he founded Association of Construction of Polish Churches (Towarzystwo Budowy Kosciolw Polskich), which was a counterbalance to local churches, where German priests were in the majority. Due to his efforts, in 1924, local Poles received former military complex in Langfuhr, where St. Stanislaus Church was opened in May 1925. The church quickly became one of the most important centers of Polish community of the Free City of Danzig, where numerous celebrations took place.

== Activities in the Free City of Danzig ==
Between 1933 and 1934, Komorowski was the only Polish member of the 54-person City Council of the city. He ran in the 1933 election to the Popular Assembly (Volkstag), but lost. For a few weeks in 1935, Komorowski served in the Assembly, for Erazm Czarnecki, who had temporarily left Danzig; after that, he ran in the 7 April 1935 election, losing again. Later on, he founded Gmina Polska Association of Poles, and was a very active member of the Polish community. On 10 October 1937, the Bishop of Danzig, Edward O'Rourke, nominated Komorowski to the post of a parish priest of the so-called personal parishes, which served Polish minority of the city. However, under pressure of Danzig's national socialists, O'Rourke's decision was cancelled by the authorities of the Free City of Danzig. As a result, the Bishop resigned from his post, and was replaced by Karol Maria Splett, who did not give permission to create Polish personal parishes.

Komorowski, who also served Polish students in Danzig, supported and protected them on several occasions. On 25th anniversary of his service, 2 April 1939, a special mass took place in St. Stanislaus Church, which turned into a patriotic demonstration. Among the faithful, there was General Commissioner of Poland in Danzig, Marian Chodacki.

== Death ==
On 1 September 1939, Komorowski together with other Polish priests, was arrested, beaten, and sent to a prison in Danzig's Victoriaschule. Soon afterwards, the Germans placed him in Stutthof concentration camp. Polish World War II survivor Roman Chrzanowski wrote in his book "Gdańsk 1939": "I remember when a week after my arrival, Father Komorowski was taken out of some basement. He was led to the middle of a field, where he was knocked unconscious. Covered in blood, he did not look like a human being. After having been thrown into a barrel with water, he was sent back to the basement".

Komorowski, together with a number of Polish activists, was murdered on Good Friday, 22 March 1940 in the woods near the camp. After the war, all bodies were exhumed, and buried at a cemetery in the Gdańsk district of Zaspa. On 13 June 1999, Komorowski was among 108 Polish martyrs of World War II, blessed in Warsaw by Pope John Paul II. Named after him was elementary school number 49 in Gdańsk-Wrzeszcz, as well as a square in the same district of the city.

== See also ==
- Stutthof trial
- Nazi crimes against ethnic Poles
- Soap made from human corpses
- List of Nazi-German concentration camps
- List of subcamps of Stutthof
- Rescue of Stutthof victims in Denmark
- Maximilian Kolbe
