= Pólko, Starogard County =

Village in Pomeranian Voivodeship, Poland

Pólko
- Village
- Location within Poland
- Coordinates: 53°50′3″N 18°33′18″E
- Country: Poland
- Voivodeship: Pomeranian
- County: Starogard
- Gmina: Skórcz
- Time zone: UTC+1 (CET)
  - Summer (DST): UTC+2 (CEST)
- Vehicle registration: GST

Pólko [ˈpulkɔ] is a village in the administrative district of Gmina Skórcz, within Starogard County, Pomeranian Voivodeship, in northern Poland. It is located in the ethnocultural region of Kociewie in the historic region of Pomerania.
