= Drewniaczki =

Village in Pomeranian Voivodeship, Poland

- Settlement
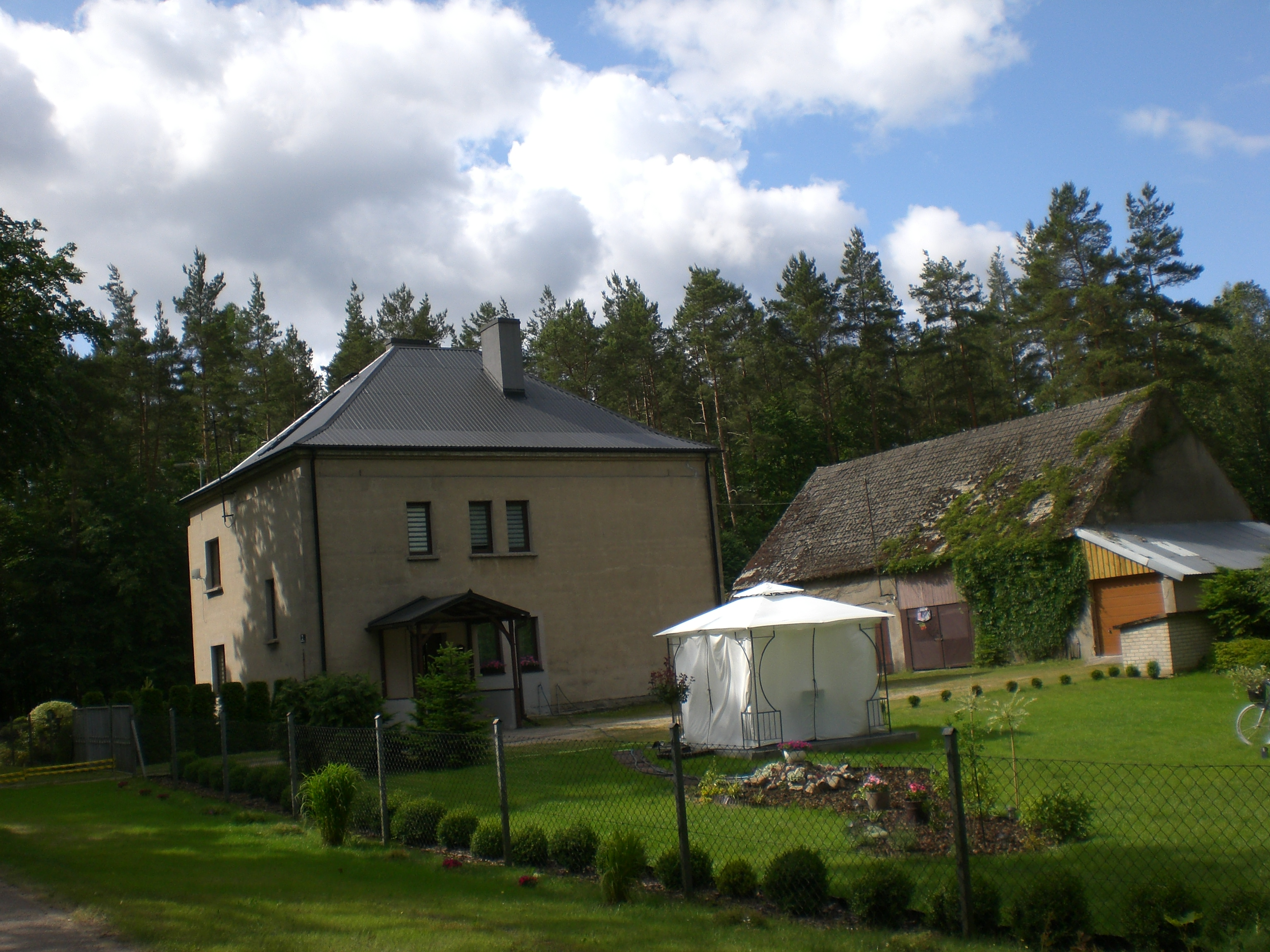

- Location within Poland
- Coordinates: 53°48′47″N 18°27′08″E
- Country: Poland
- Voivodeship: Pomeranian
- County: Starogard
- Gmina: Skórcz
- Time zone: UTC+1 (CET)
  - Summer (DST): UTC+2 (CEST)
- Vehicle registration: GST

Drewniaczki [drɛvˈɲat͡ʂki] is a settlement in the administrative district of Gmina Skórcz, within Starogard County, Pomeranian Voivodeship, in northern Poland. It is located within the ethnocultural region of Kociewie in the historic region of Pomerania.
