= Jabłówko, Pomeranian Voivodeship =

Village in Pomeranian Voivodeship, Poland

Jabłówko
- Village
- Location within Poland
- Coordinates: 53°54′40″N 18°33′52″E
- Country: Poland
- Voivodeship: Pomeranian
- County: Starogard
- Gmina: Bobowo
- Population (2022): 414
- Time zone: UTC+1 (CET)
  - Summer (DST): UTC+2 (CEST)
- Vehicle registration: GST

Jabłówko [jaˈbwufkɔ] is a village in the administrative district of Gmina Bobowo, within Starogard County, Pomeranian Voivodeship, in northern Poland. It is located within the ethnocultural region of Kociewie in the historic region of Pomerania.
