= Rombark =

Village in Kociewie

- Village
- Location within Poland
- Coordinates: 53°53′18″N 18°39′0″E
- Country: Poland
- Voivodeship: Pomeranian
- County: Tczew
- Gmina: Pelplin
- Population: 116
- Time zone: UTC+1 (CET)
  - Summer (DST): UTC+2 (CEST)
- Vehicle registration: GTC

Rombark [ˈrɔmbark] is a village in the administrative district of Gmina Pelplin, within Tczew County, Pomeranian Voivodeship, in northern Poland. It is located within the ethnocultural region of Kociewie in the historic region of Pomerania.

== History ==
The first known mention of the village in the historical record dates from 1302 when the settlement was recorded as Ronnenberg in legal documents. Rombark became a private church village of the monastery in Pelplin, administratively located in the Tczew County in the Pomeranian Voivodeship of the Polish Crown. As a result of the First Partition, the village was absorbed into the Kingdom of Prussia where it was administered under Marienwerder and later Kreis Preußisch Stargard as part of West Prussia. During the War of the Fourth Coalition Rombark was briefly controlled by the forces of Jan Henryk Dąbrowski, but was returned to the control of Prussia as part of the Regierungsbezirk of Danzig.

The village would become part of the Second Polish Republic after WWI. During WWII Rombark was annexed by Nazi Germany and renamed Rombarg. After the area was liberated by allied forces in March 1945, the settlement was renamed Kapitulne, before reverting to Rombark. In 1947 a Folk high school was established in the village and a decade later a State Agricultural Farm was organised on some of the surrounding agricultural lands.

== Transport ==
The Polish A1 motorway runs nearby, west of the village.
