= Płotowo =

- Village
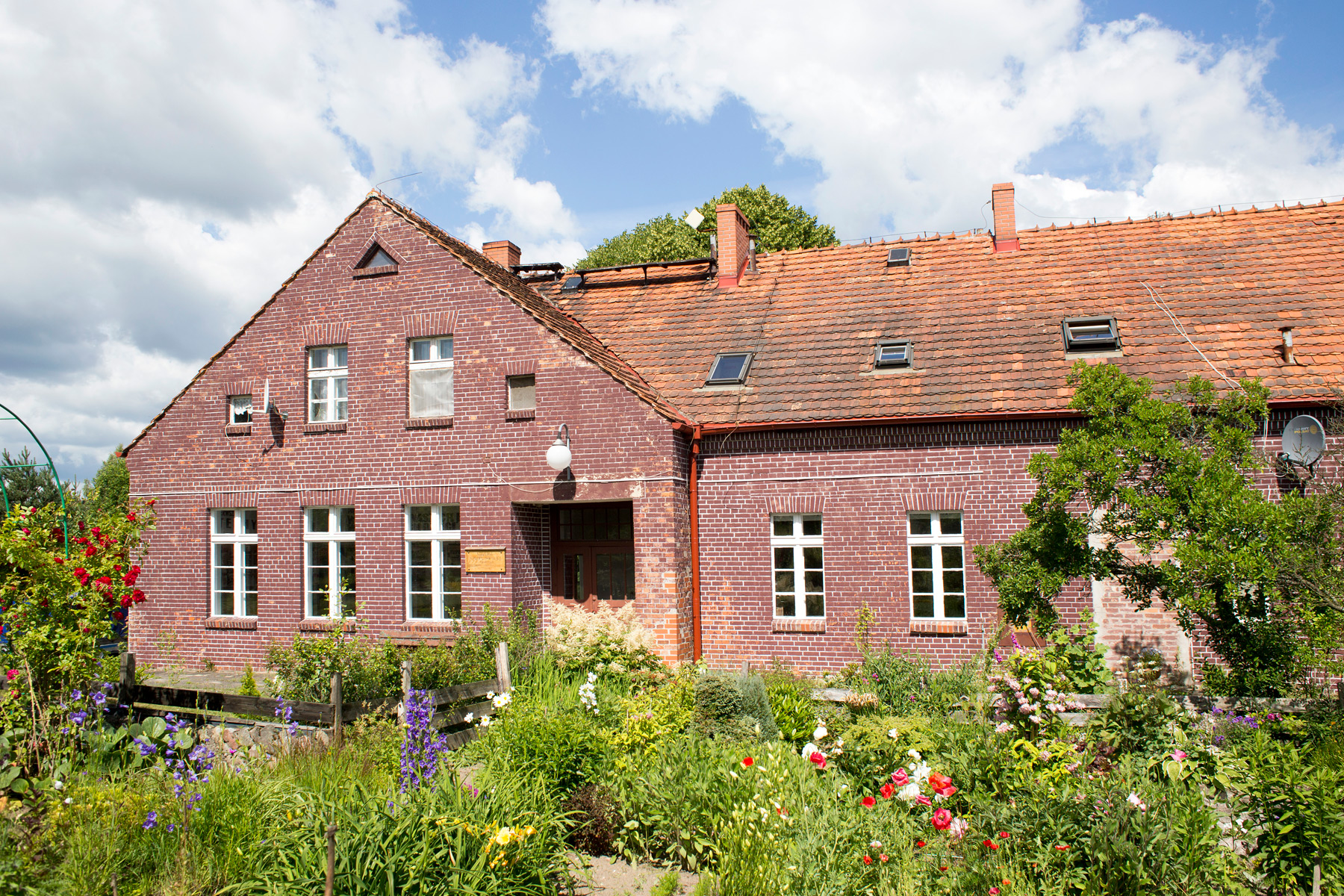
- Polish School Museum in Płotowo

- Location within Poland
- Coordinates: 54°5′48″N 17°25′34″E
- Country: Poland
- Voivodeship: Pomeranian
- County: Bytów
- Gmina: Bytów
- Population: 205
- Time zone: UTC+1 (CET)
  - Summer (DST): UTC+2 (CEST)
- Vehicle registration: GBY

Płotowo ([pwɔˈtɔvɔ]; German: Platenheim) is a village in the administrative district of Gmina Bytów, within Bytów County, Pomeranian Voivodeship, in northern Poland. It is located on the shore of Duża Boruja Lake in the region of Kashubia.

== History ==
In 1867, it had a population of 117, solely Catholic by confession.

During the German invasion of Poland, which started World War II in September 1939, the Germans carried out arrests of local Polish leaders and activists (see Nazi crimes against the Polish nation). The seven-member family of Chamier-Gliszczyński fled persecution to Borzechowo, but they were also captured there by the German police, then imprisoned in Starogard Gdański and murdered in the Szpęgawski Forest.
