= Pinczyn =

Village in Pomeranian Voivodeship, Poland

- Village
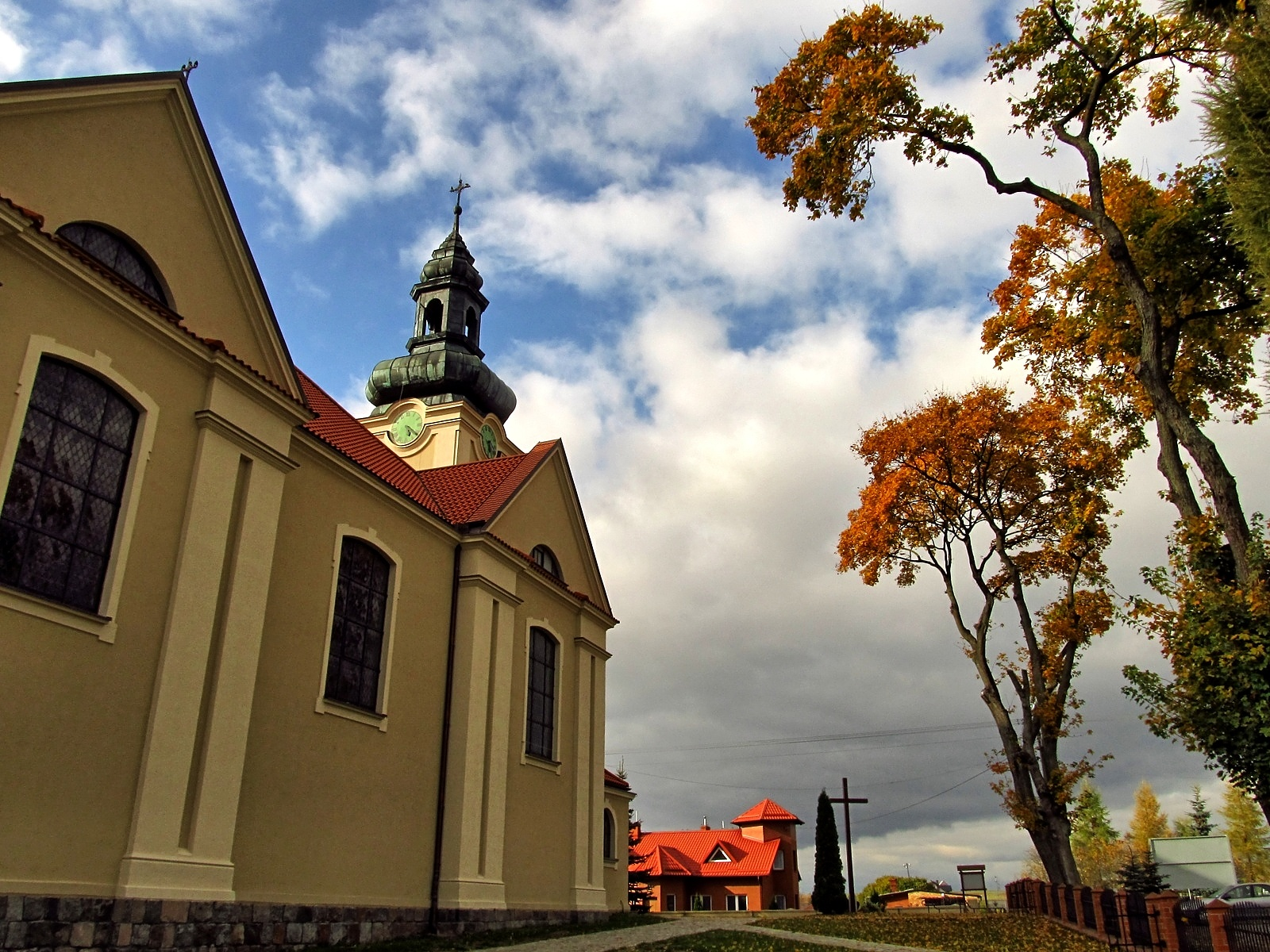
- Saint Elisabeth church in Pinczyn

- Location within Poland
- Coordinates: 53°57′44″N 18°20′47″E
- Country: Poland
- Voivodeship: Pomeranian
- County: Starogard
- Gmina: Zblewo
- Highest elevation: 142 m (466 ft)
- Lowest elevation: 102 m (335 ft)
- Population: 2,697
- Time zone: UTC+1 (CET)
  - Summer (DST): UTC+2 (CEST)
- Vehicle registration: GST

Pinczyn [ˈpint͡ʂɨn] is a village in the administrative district of Gmina Zblewo, within Starogard County, Pomeranian Voivodeship, in northern Poland. It is located within the ethnocultural region of Kociewie in the historic region of Pomerania.

== History ==
Pinczyn was a royal village of the Polish Crown, administratively located in the Tczew County in the Pomeranian Voivodeship.

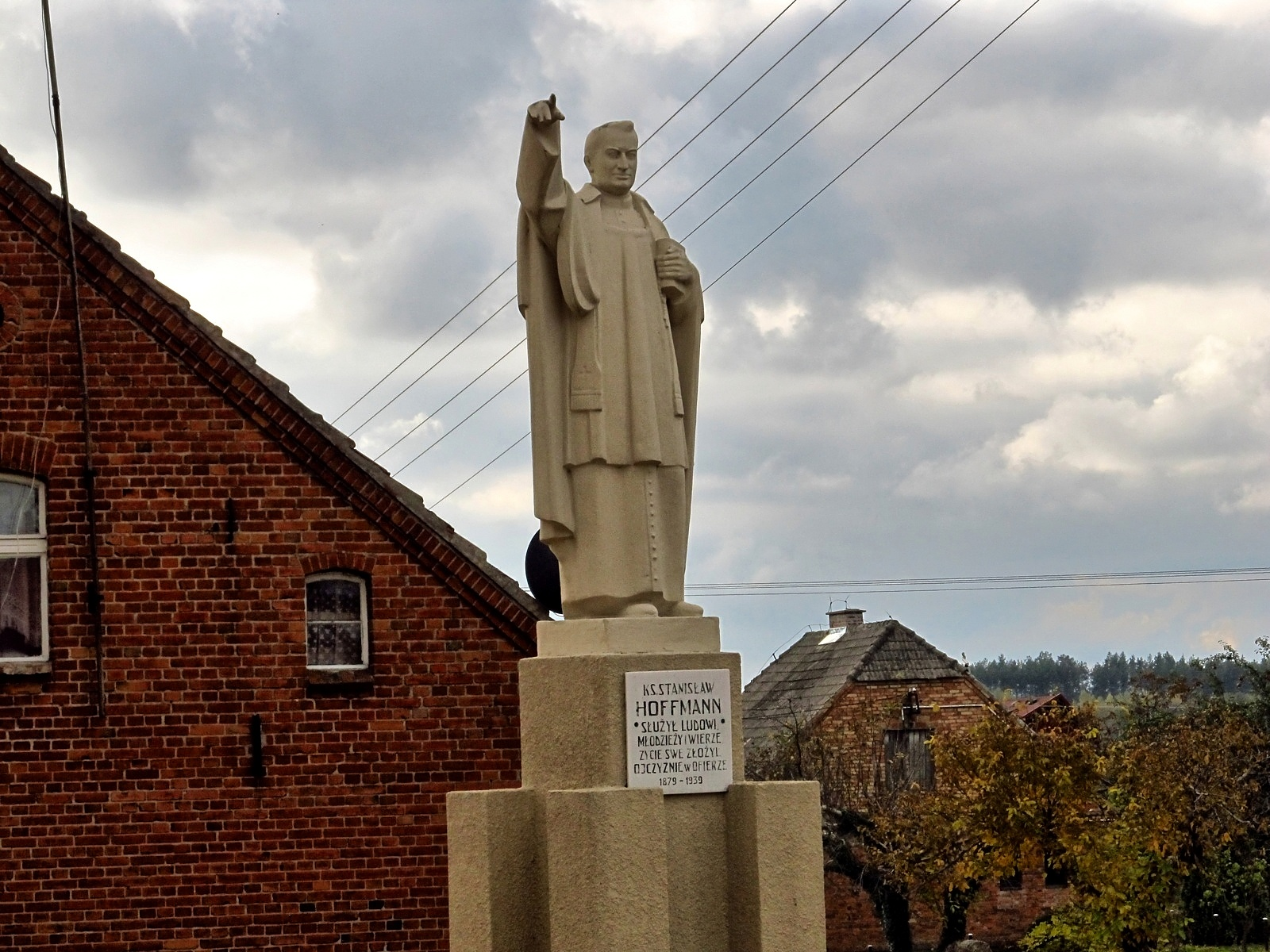
Monument to Stanisław Hoffman, pre-war Pinczyn parish priest murdered by the Germans in October 1939

During the German occupation of Poland (World War II), local Poles were subjected to various crimes. The local parish priest Stanisław Hoffman was arrested on October 13, 1939, imprisoned and tortured in Starogard Gdański, and murdered in the Szpęgawski Forest along with other Polish priests on October 16. Local Polish teachers were murdered in the Szpęgawski Forest on October 20, 1939, and several Poles from Pinczyn were in 1939 also murdered in the Zajączek forest nearby (see Intelligenzaktion). In 1942, several Polish families were expelled from the village to Potulice and afterwards deported either to the General Government or to forced labour, while their farms were handed over to German colonists as part of the Lebensraum policy.
