= Nowy Bukowiec, Starogard County =

Village in Pomeranian Voivodeship, Poland

Nowy Bukowiec
- Village
- Location within Poland
- Coordinates: 53°48′15″N 18°28′25″E
- Country: Poland
- Voivodeship: Pomeranian
- County: Starogard
- Gmina: Skórcz
- Time zone: UTC+1 (CET)
  - Summer (DST): UTC+2 (CEST)
- Vehicle registration: GST

Nowy Bukowiec [ˈnɔvɨ buˈkɔvjɛt͡s] is a village in the administrative district of Gmina Skórcz, within Starogard County, Pomeranian Voivodeship, in northern Poland. It is located within the ethnocultural region of Kociewie in the historic region of Pomerania.
