= Wysoka, Starogard County =

Village in Pomeranian Voivodeship, Poland

Wysoka
- Village
- Location within Poland
- Coordinates: 53°52′39″N 18°29′46″E
- Country: Poland
- Voivodeship: Pomeranian
- County: Starogard
- Gmina: Bobowo
- Population: 463
- Time zone: UTC+1 (CET)
  - Summer (DST): UTC+2 (CEST)
- Vehicle registration: GST

Wysoka [vɨˈsɔka] is a village in the administrative district of Gmina Bobowo, within Starogard County, Pomeranian Voivodeship, in northern Poland. It is located within the ethnocultural region of Kociewie in the historic region of Pomerania.

== History ==
Wysoka was a royal village of the Kingdom of Poland, administratively located in the Tczew County in the Pomeranian Voivodeship.

During the German occupation of Poland (World War II), several Polish families from Wysoka were expelled and their farms were handed over to Germans as part of the Lebensraum policy.
