= Czarnylas, Pomeranian Voivodeship =

Village in Pomeranian Voivodeship, Poland

Czarnylas
- Village
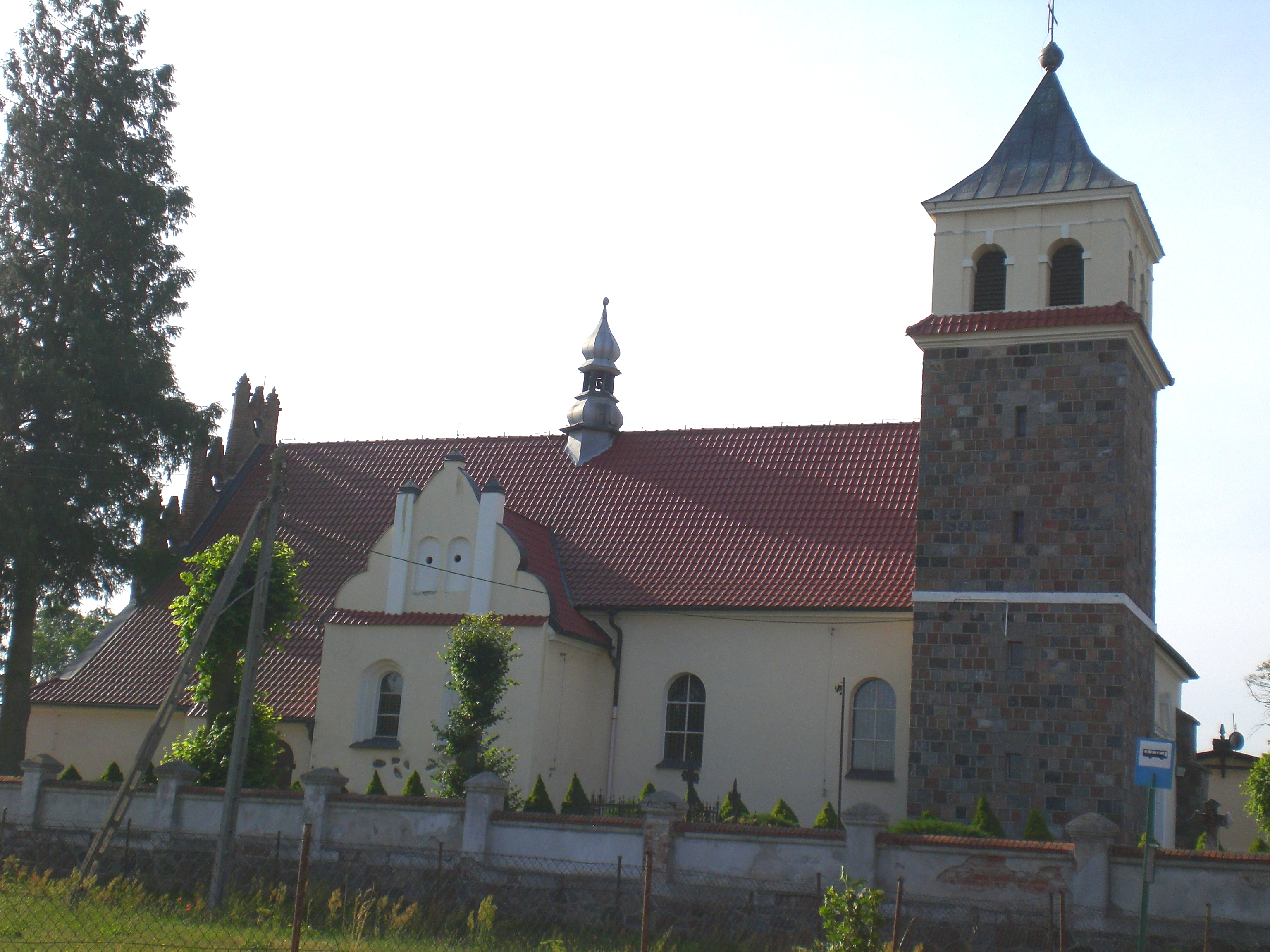
- Saint Andrew church in Czarnylas

- Location within Poland
- Coordinates: 53°50′26″N 18°29′31″E
- Country: Poland
- Voivodeship: Pomeranian
- County: Starogard
- Gmina: Skórcz
- Population: 473
- Time zone: UTC+1 (CET)
  - Summer (DST): UTC+2 (CEST)
- Vehicle registration: GST

Czarnylas [t͡ʂarˈnɨlas] is a village in the administrative district of Gmina Skórcz, within Starogard County, Pomeranian Voivodeship, in northern Poland. It is located within the ethnocultural region of Kociewie in the historic region of Pomerania.

The landmark of Czarnylas is the Saint Andrew church, which dates back to the 14th century.

== History ==
Czarnylas was a royal village of the Polish Crown, administratively located in the Tczew County in the Pomeranian Voivodeship. It was annexed by Prussia in the First Partition of Poland in 1772, and restored to Poland, after Poland regained independence in 1918.

During the German occupation of Poland (World War II), teachers from Czarnylas were among Polish teachers murdered by the Germans on October 20, 1939, in the Szpęgawski Forest as part of the Intelligenzaktion. Polish inhabitants of Czarnylas were also murdered in large massacres carried out in late 1939 in the Szpęgawski and Zajączek forests.
