= Czarne, Gmina Skórcz =

Village in Pomeranian Voivodeship, Poland

Czarne
- Settlement
- Location within Poland
- Coordinates: 53°45′51″N 18°31′11″E
- Country: Poland
- Voivodeship: Pomeranian
- County: Starogard
- Gmina: Skórcz
- Time zone: UTC+1 (CET)
  - Summer (DST): UTC+2 (CEST)
- Vehicle registration: GST

Czarne [ˈt͡ʂarnɛ] is a settlement in the administrative district of Gmina Skórcz, within Starogard County, Pomeranian Voivodeship, in northern Poland. It is located within the ethnocultural region of Kociewie in the historic region of Pomerania.
