= Mirotki, Pomeranian Voivodeship =

Village in Pomeranian Voivodeship, Poland

Mirotki
- Village
- Location within Poland
- Coordinates: 53°46′4″N 18°34′47″E
- Country: Poland
- Voivodeship: Pomeranian
- County: Starogard
- Gmina: Skórcz
- Population: 484
- Time zone: UTC+1 (CET)
  - Summer (DST): UTC+2 (CEST)
- Vehicle registration: GST

Mirotki [miˈrɔtki] is a village in the administrative district of Gmina Skórcz, within Starogard County, Pomeranian Voivodeship, in northern Poland. It is located within the ethnocultural region of Kociewie in the historic region of Pomerania.
