= Borzechowo =

Village in Pomeranian Voivodeship, Poland

- Village
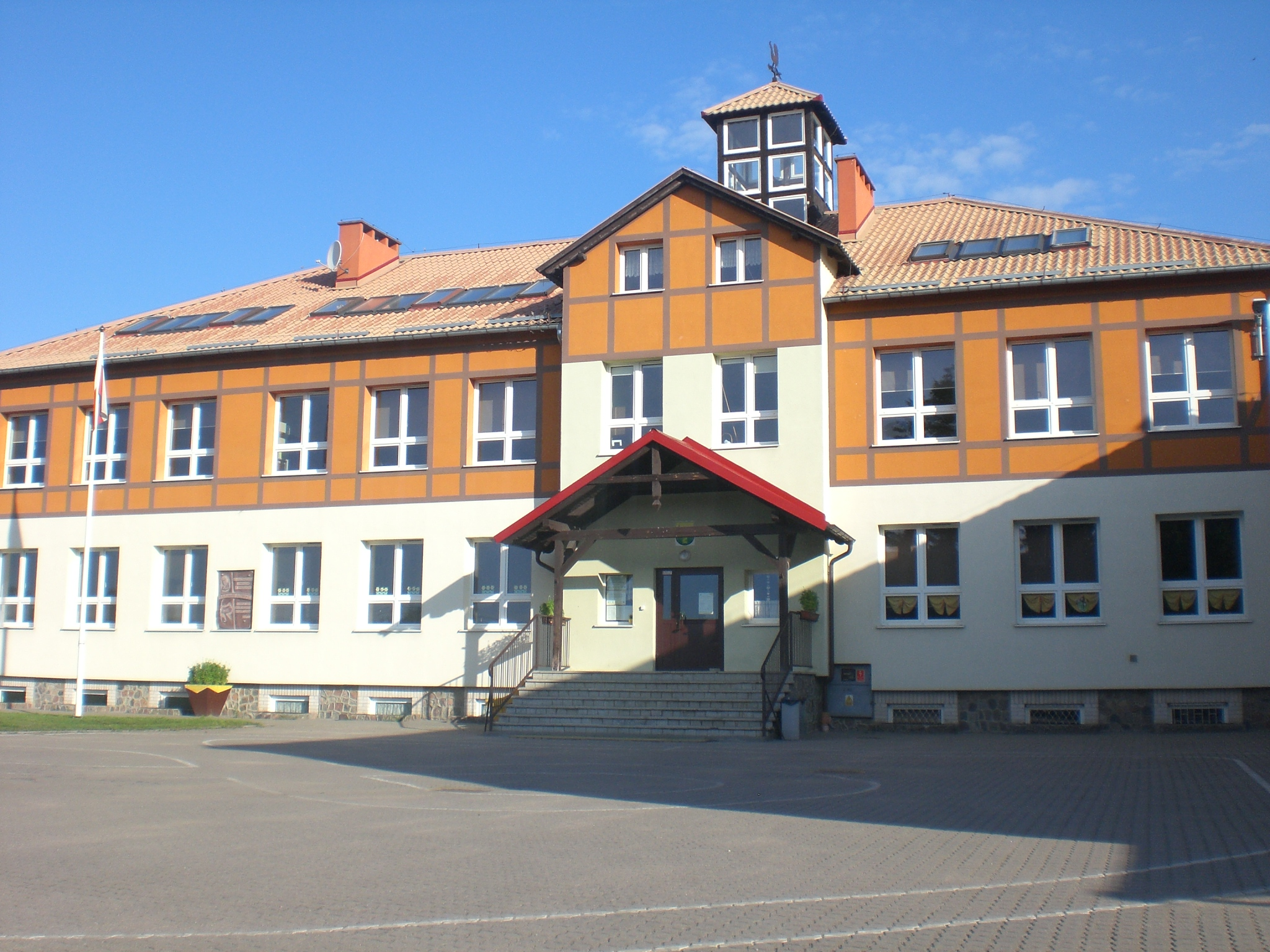
- The village school

- Location within Poland
- Coordinates: 53°53′15″N 18°20′57″E
- Country: Poland
- Voivodeship: Pomeranian
- County: Starogard
- Gmina: Zblewo
- Highest elevation: 120 m (390 ft)
- Lowest elevation: 105 m (344 ft)
- Population: 938
- Time zone: UTC+1 (CET)
  - Summer (DST): UTC+2 (CEST)
- Vehicle registration: GST

Borzechowo [bɔʐɛˈxɔvɔ] is a village in the administrative district of Gmina Zblewo, within Starogard County, Pomeranian Voivodeship, in northern Poland. It is located on the shores of Borzechowskie Wielkie and Borzechowskie Małe lakes within the ethnocultural region of Kociewie in the historic region of Pomerania.

The landmark of Borzechowo is Saint Anne's church.

== History ==
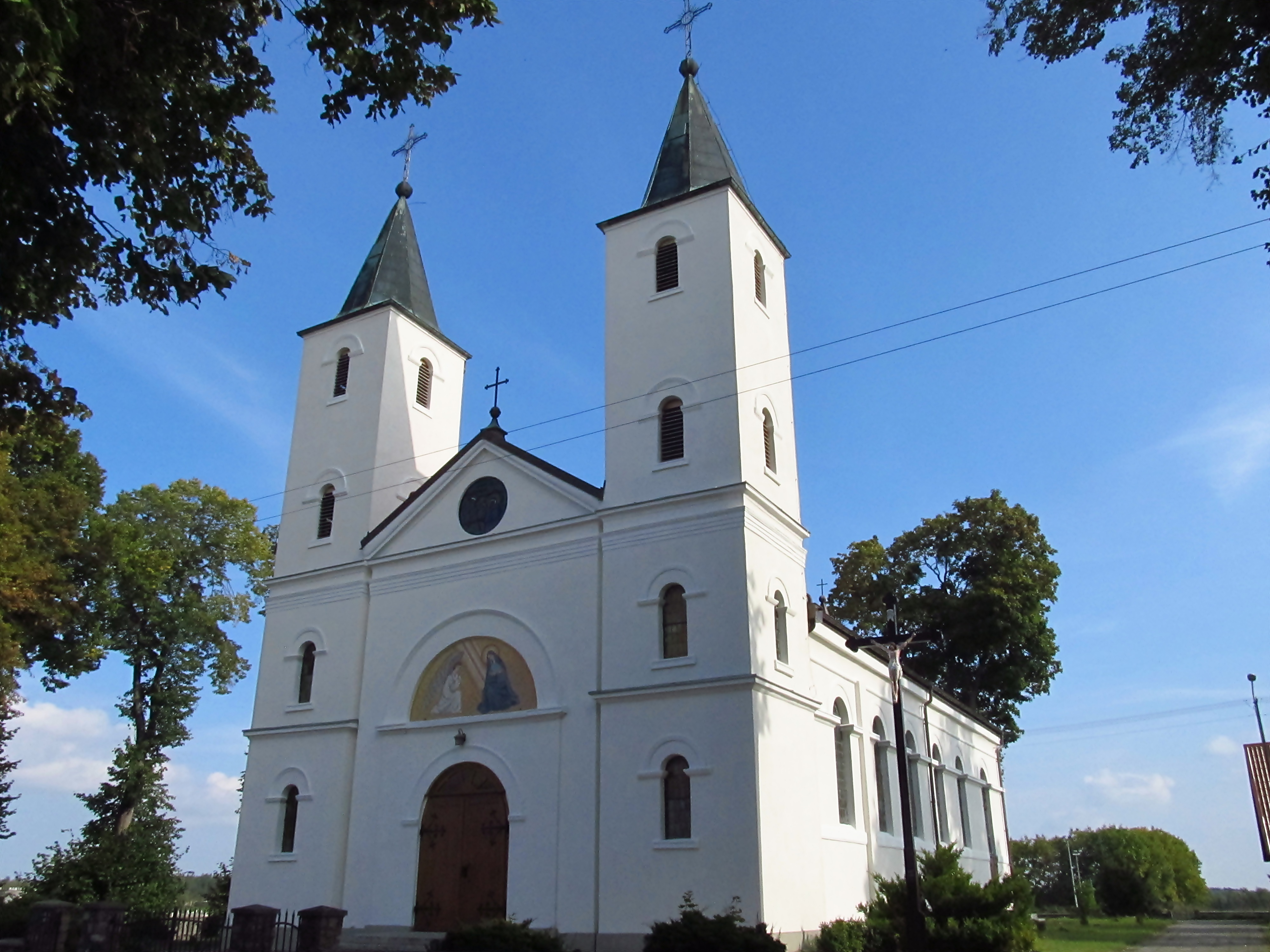
Saint Anne's church

Borzechowo was a royal village of the Polish Crown, administratively located in the Tczew County in the Pomeranian Voivodeship. It was annexed by Prussia in the First Partition of Poland in 1772. Despite the annexation, in the 19th century the village's population remained overwhelmingly Polish. After Poland regained independence in 1918, the village was restored to Poland.

During the German occupation of Poland (World War II), the Germans arrested the seven-member Polish family of Chamier-Gliszczyński, pre-war Polish activists, who stayed in the village after fleeing persecution in Płotowo. They were imprisoned in Starogard Gdański and then murdered in the Szpęgawski Forest along with the owner of the house in which they stayed. Teachers from Borzechowo were among Polish teachers murdered by the Germans on October 20, 1939, in the Szpęgawski Forest as part of the Intelligenzaktion.
