= Bobowo =

Village in Pomeranian Voivodeship, Poland

- Village
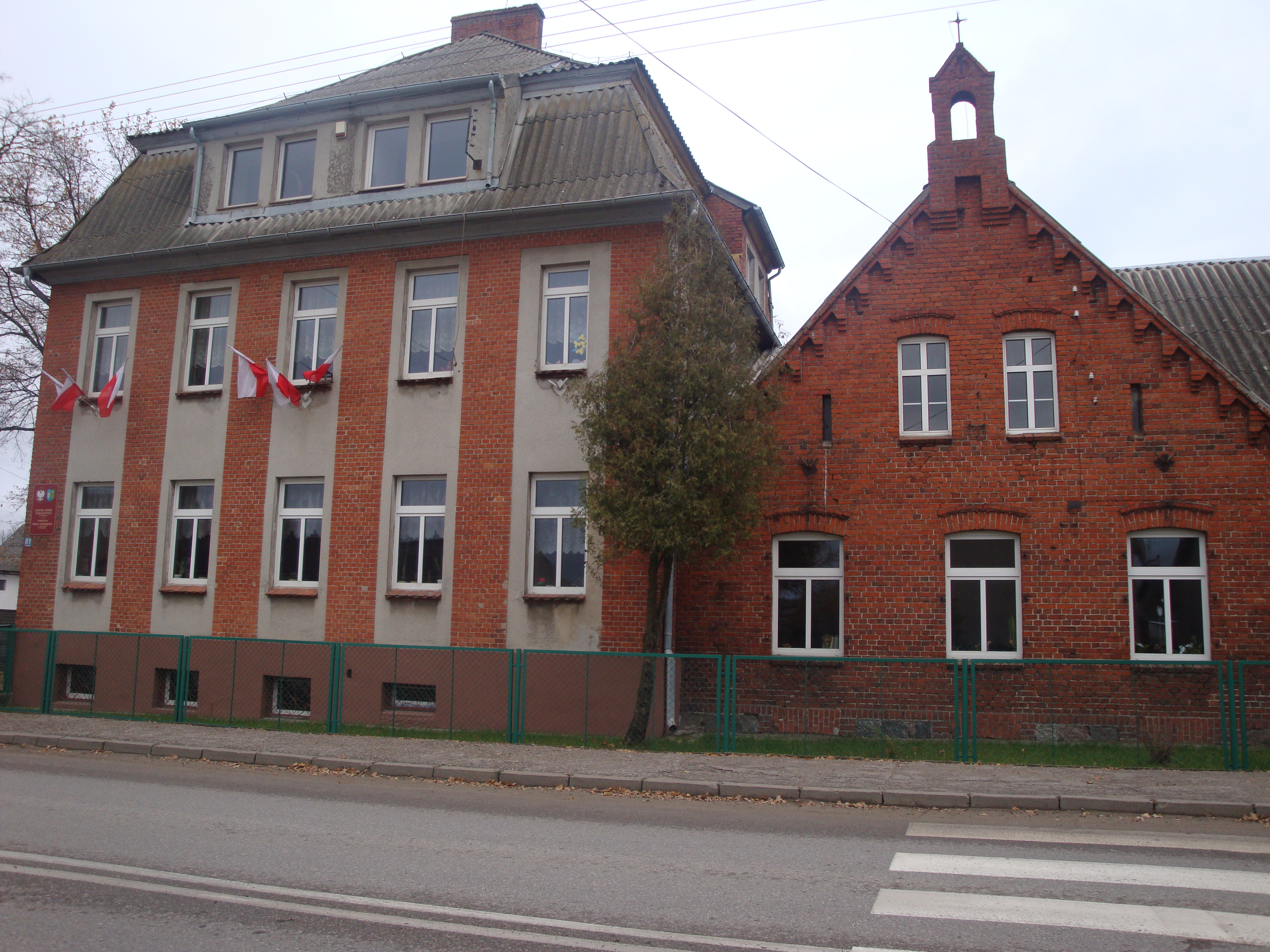
- Primary school in Bobowo

- Location within Poland
- Coordinates: 53°53′3″N 18°33′22″E
- Country: Poland
- Voivodeship: Pomeranian
- County: Starogard
- Gmina: Bobowo

Population (2022)
  - Total: 1,485
- Time zone: UTC+1 (CET)
  - Summer (DST): UTC+2 (CEST)
- Vehicle registration: GST

Bobowo [bɔˈbɔvɔ] is a village in Starogard County, Pomeranian Voivodeship, in northern Poland. It is the seat of the gmina (administrative district) called Gmina Bobowo. It is located within the ethnocultural region of Kociewie in the historic region of Pomerania.

The landmark of Bobowo is the Saint Adalbert church.

== History ==
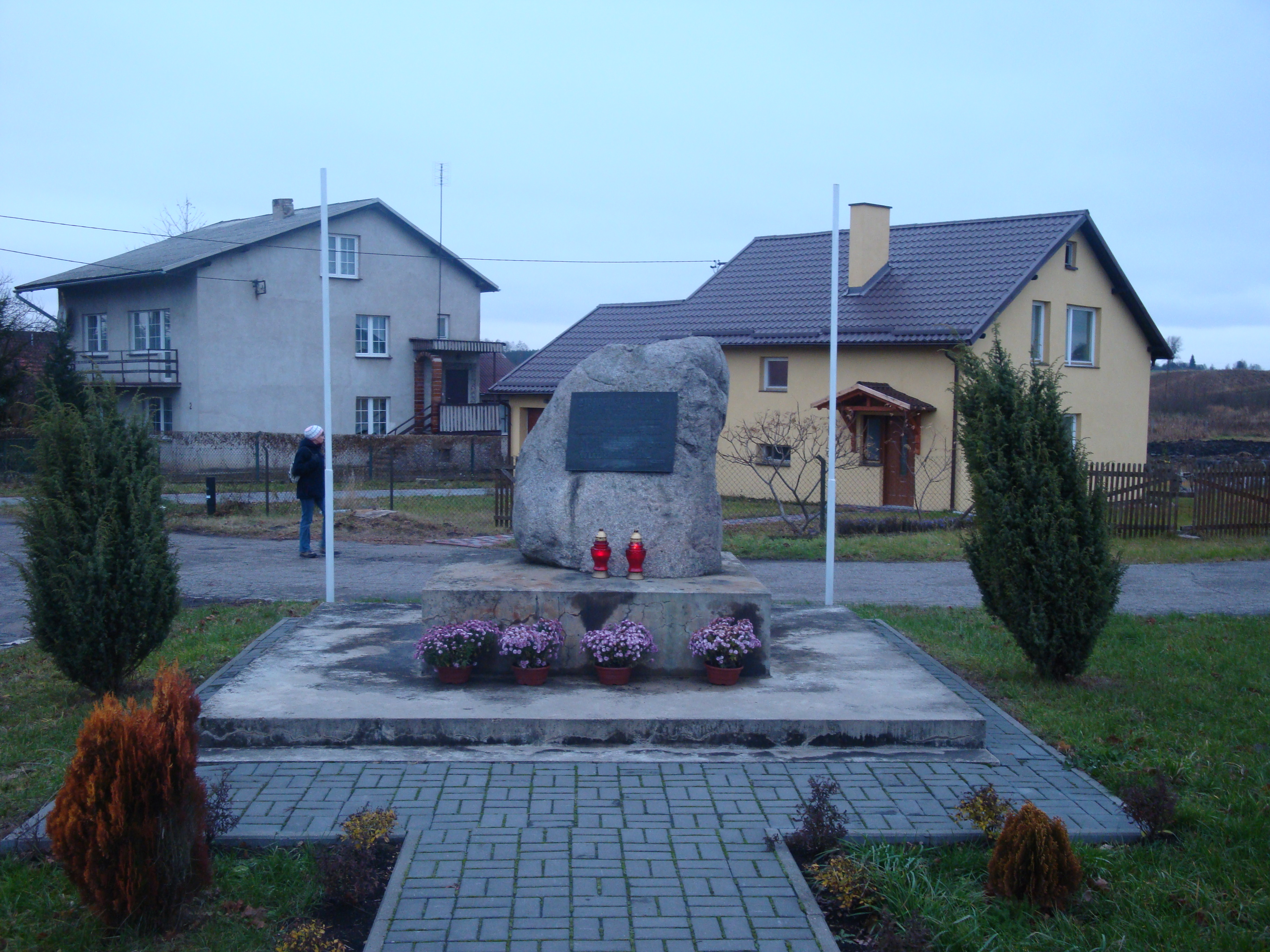
Memorial to Polish farmers of Bobowo killed during the German occupation of Poland (World War II)

Bobowo was a royal village of the Polish Crown, administratively located in the Tczew County in the Pomeranian Voivodeship. It was annexed by Prussia in the First Partition of Poland in 1772. Despite the partitions, the village remained a local Polish center in the 19th century, there were Polish organizations in Bobowo, including a bank founded in 1866. After Poland regained independence in 1918, the village was restored to Poland.

During the German occupation of Poland (World War II), in October 1939, the Germans carried out a massacre of seven Poles in the village. Teachers from Bobowo were among Polish teachers murdered by the Germans on October 20, 1939, in the Szpęgawski Forest as part of the Intelligenzaktion. Dozens of Polish families were expelled to the General Government, deported for forced labour to Germany or assigned as forced laborers to new German colonists.
