= Barłożno =

Village in Pomeranian Voivodeship, Poland

- Village
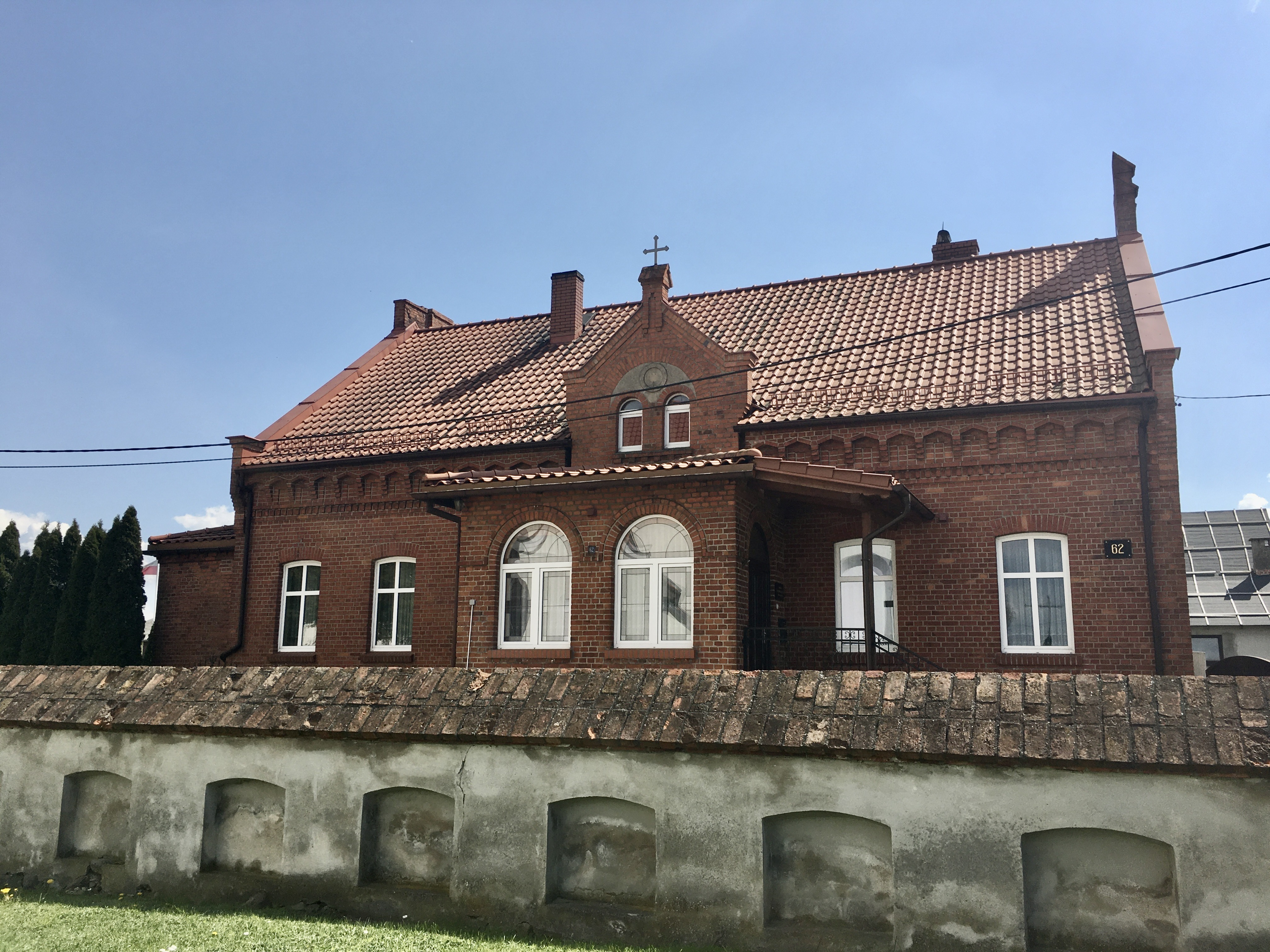
- The rectory in Barłożno

- Location within Poland
- Coordinates: 53°47′11″N 18°36′46″E
- Country: Poland
- Voivodeship: Pomeranian
- County: Starogard
- Gmina: Skórcz

Population
  - Total: 800
- Time zone: UTC+1 (CET)
  - Summer (DST): UTC+2 (CEST)
- Vehicle registration: GST

Barłożno [barˈwɔʐnɔ] is a village in the administrative district of Gmina Skórcz, within Starogard County, Pomeranian Voivodeship, in northern Poland. It is located in the ethnocultural region of Kociewie in the historic region of Pomerania.

== Notable people ==
- Bronisław Komorowski
