= Skórcz =

Town in Pomeranian Voivodeship, Poland

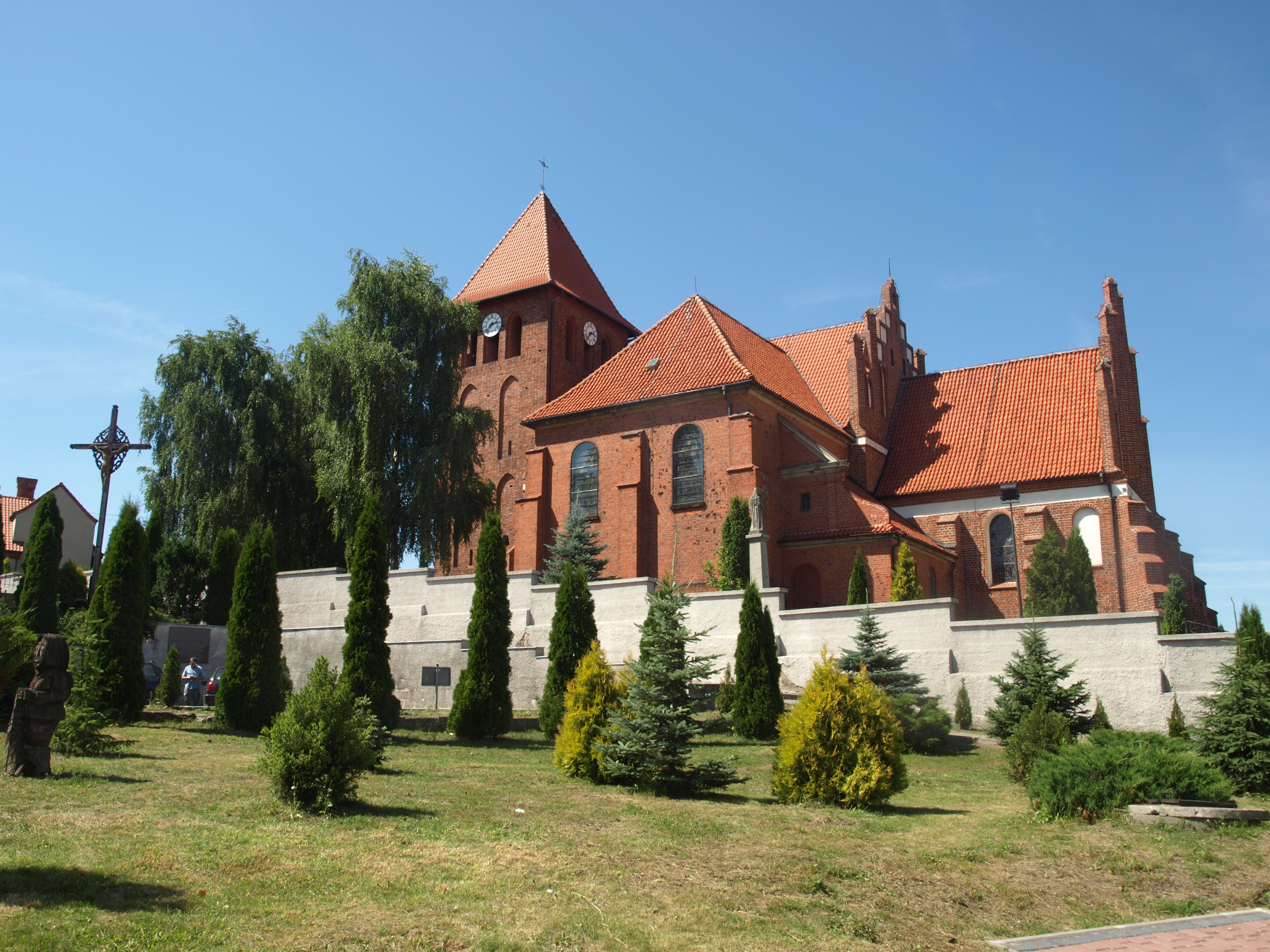
- Church of All Saints

- Coat of arms

- Location within Poland
- Coordinates: 53°47′48″N 18°31′34″E
- Country: Poland
- Voivodeship: Pomeranian
- County: Starogard
- Gmina: Skórcz (urban gmina)

Government
  - Mayor: Janusz Kosecki

Area
  - Total: 3.67 km^{2} (1.42 sq mi)

Population (2006)
  - Total: 3,512
  - Density: 957/km^{2} (2,480/sq mi)
- Time zone: UTC+1 (CET)
  - Summer (DST): UTC+2 (CEST)
- Postal code: 83-220
- Vehicle registration: GST
- Website: http://skorcz.pl/

Skórcz [skurt͡ʂ] (German: Skurz, 1942-45: Großwollental) is a town in Starogard County, Pomeranian Voivodeship, in northern Poland, with 3,609 inhabitants (2017). It is located in the ethnocultural region of Kociewie in the historic region of Pomerania.

== History ==
Following the joint German-Soviet invasion of Poland, which started World War II in 1939, Skórcz was occupied by Germany. The nearby forest was the site of a massacre of 11 Poles committed by the German Selbstschutz. A prison of the German gendarmerie was established in the town. Poles from Skórcz were among the victims of large massacres of Poles from the region committed by the occupiers in 1939 in the forests of Szpęgawsk and Zajączek as part of the Intelligenzaktion. In 1942, the Germans renamed the town to Großwollental in attempt to erase traces of Polish origin. German occupation ended in 1945, and the town's historic name was restored.

In 2010, the first monument to Lech Kaczyński, Polish President killed in the Smolensk air disaster, was unveiled in Skórcz.

== Economy ==
Skórcz is home to the headquarters, production plant and distribution center of Iglotex, one of Poland's major producers and distributors of frozen foods. As of 2020, it employed nearly 700 people.

== Sports ==
The athletics club LLKS Ziemi Kociewskiej Skórcz is based in the town.

== Notable people ==
- Grzegorz Gajdus (born 1967) a long-distance runner, competed in the 1996 Summer Olympics
- Sławomir Pstrong (1975–2015), film and television director, screenwriter, and author of short stories.
