= Zajączek, Pomeranian Voivodeship =

Village in Pomeranian Voivodeship, Poland

Zajączek
- Village
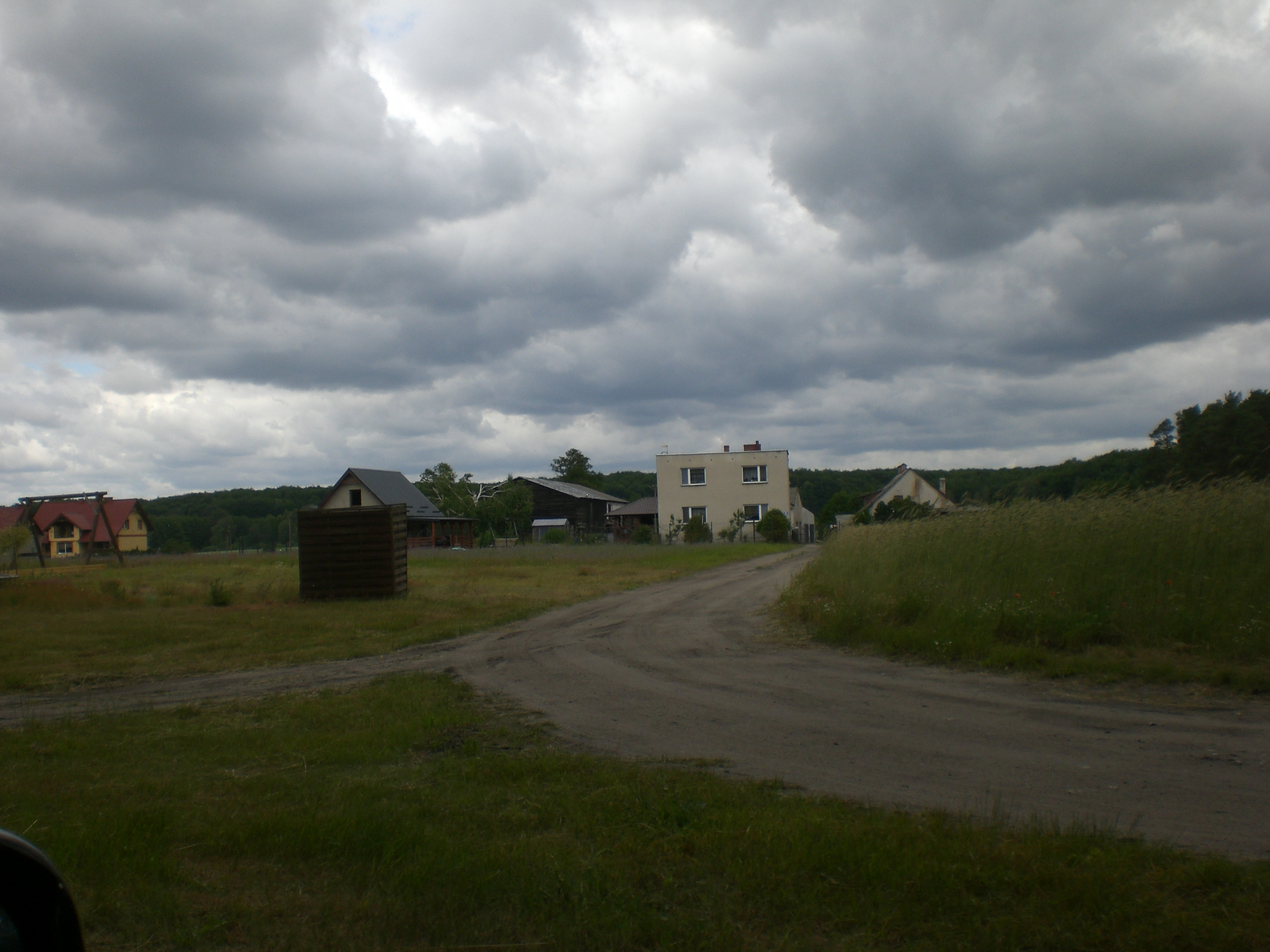

- Location within Poland
- Coordinates: 53°47′26″N 18°28′11″E
- Country: Poland
- Voivodeship: Pomeranian
- County: Starogard
- Gmina: Skórcz
- Time zone: UTC+1 (CET)
  - Summer (DST): UTC+2 (CEST)
- Vehicle registration: GST

Zajączek [zaˈjɔnt͡ʂɛk] is a village in the administrative district of Gmina Skórcz, within Starogard County, Pomeranian Voivodeship, in northern Poland. It is located in the ethnocultural region of Kociewie in the historic region of Pomerania.

== History ==
During the German occupation of Poland (World War II), the local forest was the site of a massacre of around 100 Poles from Skórcz and various nearby villages, perpetrated by the German gendarmerie and Selbstschutz in 1939, as part of the Intelligenzaktion.
