= Gmina Bobowo =

Gmina Bobowo Bobowo Commune
- Gmina
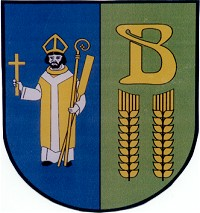
- Coat of arms
- Interactive map of Gmina Bobowo
- Coordinates (Bobowo): 53°53′3″N 18°33′22″E
- Country: Poland
- Voivodeship: Pomeranian
- County: Starogard
- Seat: Bobowo

Area
  - Total: 51.67 km^{2} (19.95 sq mi)

Population (2022)
  - Total: 3,314
  - Density: 64.14/km^{2} (166.1/sq mi)
- Website: http://bobowo.pl/

Gmina Bobowo is a rural gmina (administrative district) in Starogard County, Pomeranian Voivodeship, in northern Poland. Its seat is the village of Bobowo, which lies approximately 10 kilometres (6 mi) south of Starogard Gdański and 54 km (34 mi) south of the regional capital Gdańsk. Other villages located in the gmina are listed in the box below.

The gmina covers an area of 51.67 square kilometres (19.9 sq mi), and as of 2022 its total population is 3,314.

== Neighbouring gminas ==
Gmina Bobowo is bordered by the gminas of Lubichowo, Morzeszczyn, Pelplin, Skórcz and Starogard Gdański.
