= List of botanical gardens in Poland =

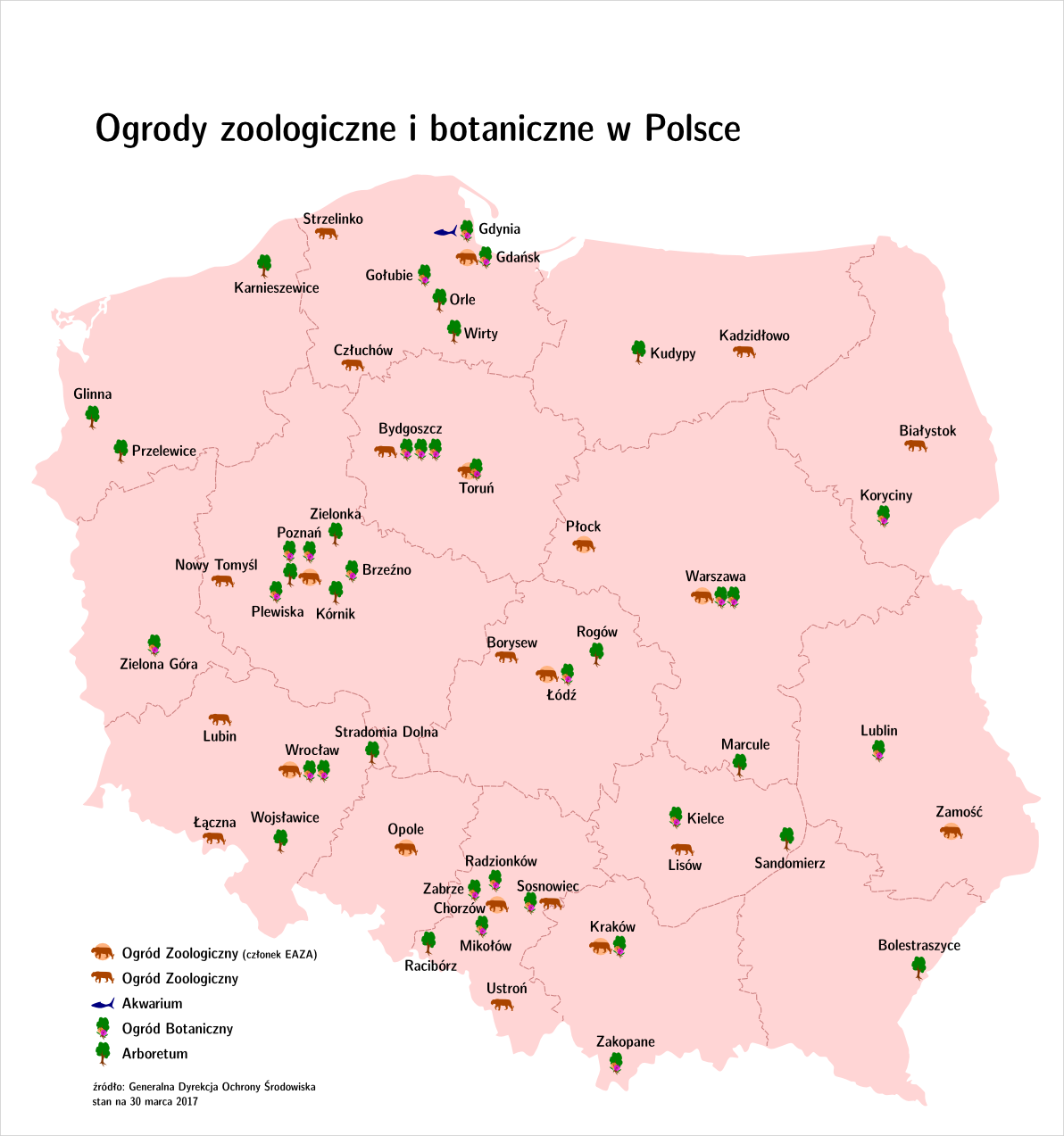
Map of botanical gardens, arboreta and zoos in Poland

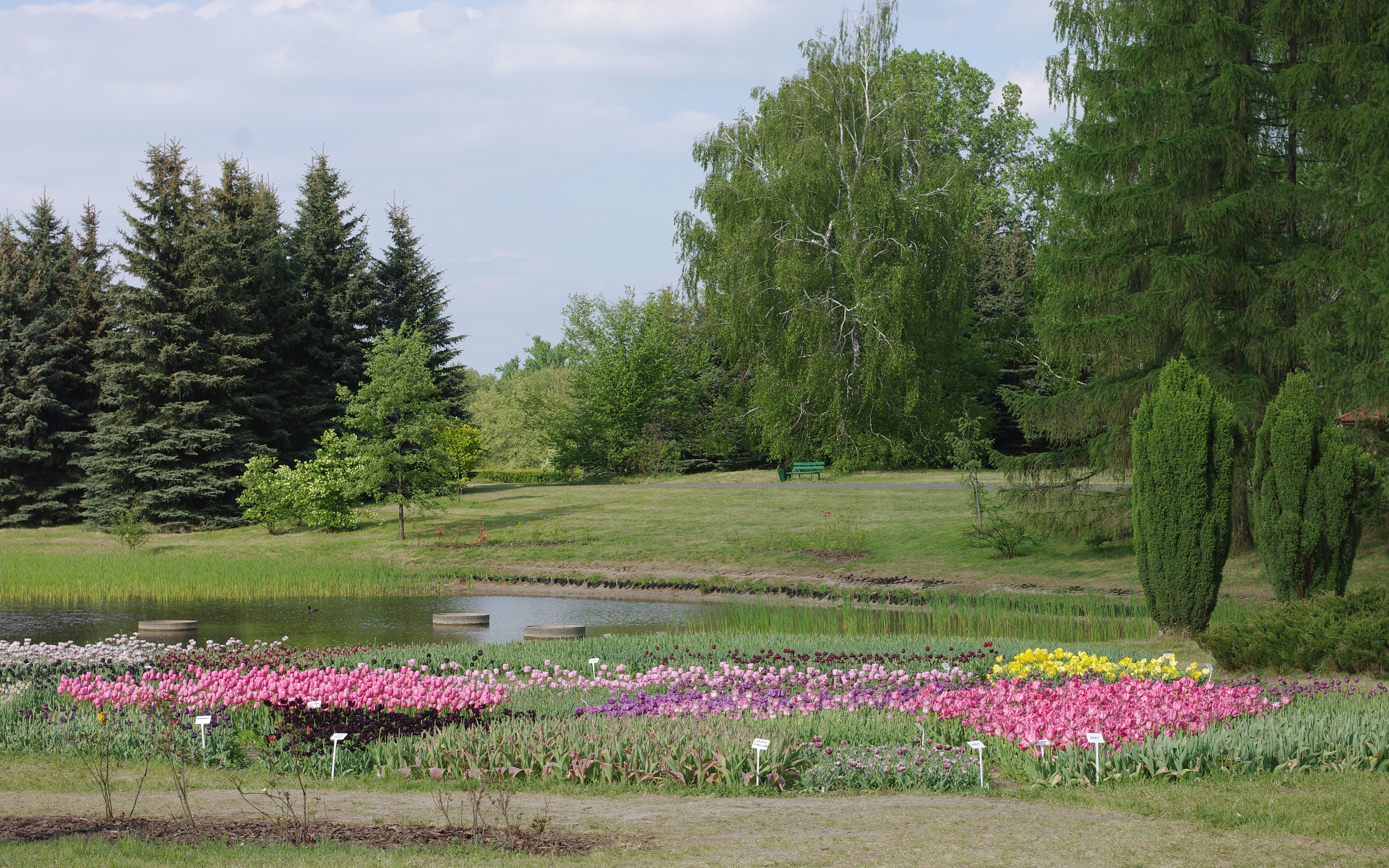
Łódź Botanical Garden, the largest in Poland

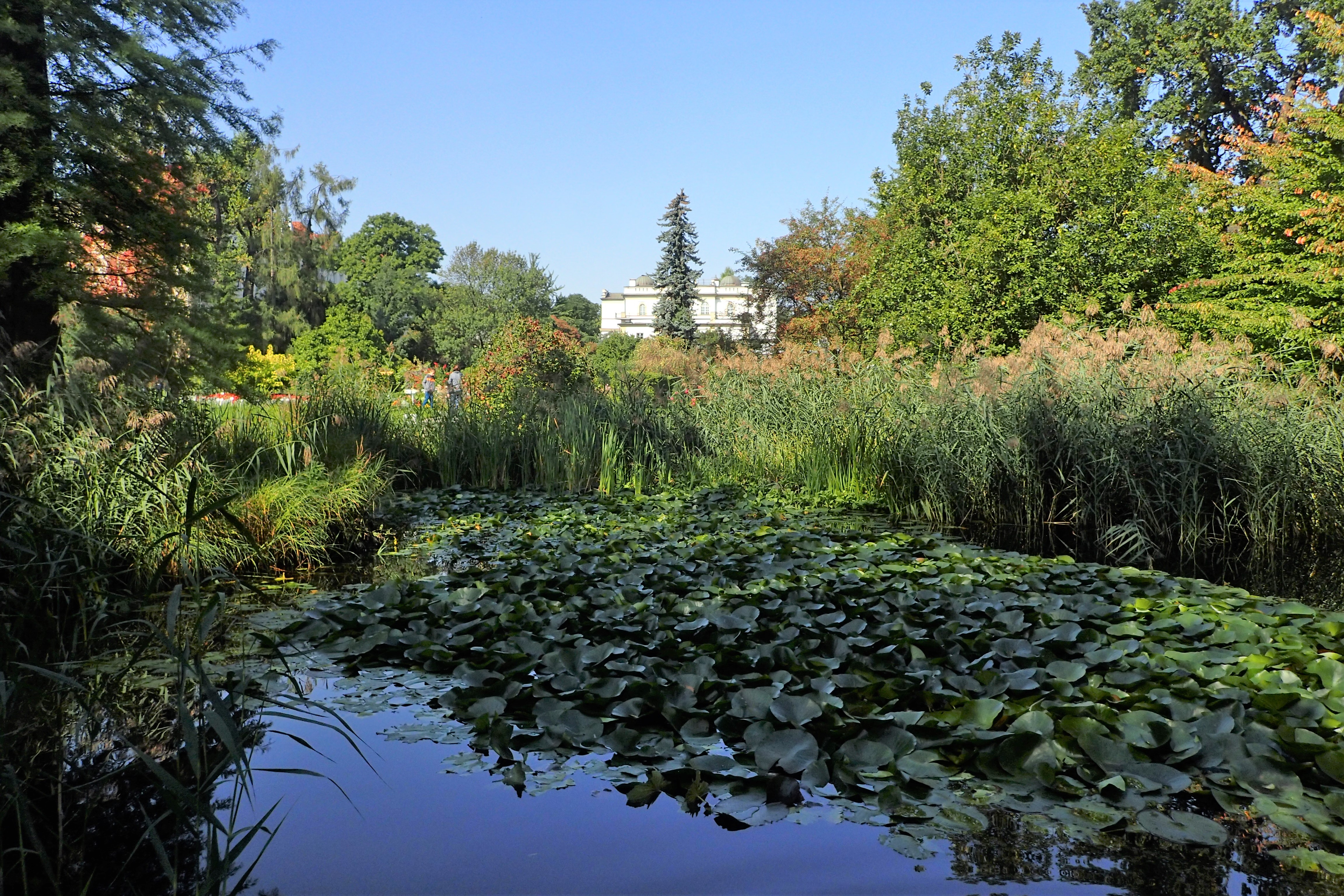
Botanic Garden of the Jagiellonian University in Kraków, the oldest in Poland

Botanical gardens in Poland have collections consisting entirely of Poland native and endemic species; most have a collection that include plants from around the world. There are botanical gardens and arboreta in all states and territories of Poland, most are administered by local governments, some are privately owned.

- Botanical Garden in Bolestraszyce
- Botanic Garden of Casimir the Great University, Bydgoszcz
- Ogród Botaniczny Leśnego Parku Kultury i Wypoczynku "Myślęcinek", Bydgoszcz
- Ogród Botaniczny w Oliwie, Gdańsk
- Marszewo Forest Botanical Garden, Gdynia
- Botanical Garden in Glinna
- Gołubieński Ogród Botaniczny, Gołubie
- Ogród Botaniczny w Kielcach, Kielce
- Podlaski Ogród Botaniczny, Koryciny
- Kórnik Arboretum, Kórnik
- Botanic Garden of the Jagiellonian University, Kraków
- Forest Arboretum, Kudypy
- Botanical Garden of the Maria Curie-Skłodowska University, Lublin
- Łódź Botanical Garden, Łódź
- Botanical Garden and Arboretum, Marcule
- Botanical Garden of the Nencki Institute of Experimental Biology of the Polish Academy of Sciences, Mikołajki
- Silesian Botanical Garden, Mikołów
- Botanical Garden in Niegoszcz
- Orle Botanical Garden, Orle
- Botanical Garden of the Adam Mickiewicz University in Poznań, Poznań
- Dendrological Garden in Przelewice
- Silesian Botanical Garden, Radzionków
- Botanical Garden, Rogów
- Egzotarium Botanical Garden, Sosnowiec
- Zoo and Botanical Garden, Toruń
- Ogród Botaniczny UW w Warszawie, Warsaw
- Ogród Botaniczny PAN w Warszawie, Warsaw
- Arboretum Wirty, Wirty
- Wojsławice Arboretum, Wojsławice
- University of Wrocław Botanical Garden, Wrocław
- Botanical Garden of the Wrocław Medical University, Wrocław
- Municipal Botanical Garden, Zabrze
- Marian Raciborski Mountain Botanical Garden of the Polish Academy of Sciences, Zakopane
- Botanical Garden of the University of Zielona Góra, Zielona Góra
- Botanical Garden of the University of Life Sciences in Poznań, Zielonka
