= Semlin =

Semlin may refer to:

- Semlin, Poland, a village
- Zemun (German: Semlin), a town in Serbia
  - Sajmište concentration camp, or Semlin concentration camp, a World War II Nazi extermination camp near Zemun
- Charles Augustus Semlin (1836–1927), Premier of British Columbia, Canada, 1898–1900
- Semlin, a type of sod house
