= Botanic Garden of the Jagiellonian University =

Botanic garden at Kraków, Poland

- Ogród Botaniczny; Uniwersytetu Jagiellońskiego
- Interactive map of Botanic Garden of the Jagiellonian University
- Type: Botanical
- Location: 27 Kopernika Street; Kraków; Poland
- Coordinates: 50°03′46.5″N 19°57′28.5″E
- Area: 9.6 hectares (24 acres)
- Created: 1783
- Founder: Commission of National Education
- Operator: Institute of Botany; Jagiellonian University
- Website: https://ogrod.uj.edu.pl/english

Historic Monument of Poland
- Designated: 1994-09-08
- Part of: Kraków historical city complex
- Reference no.: M.P. 1994 nr 50 poz. 418

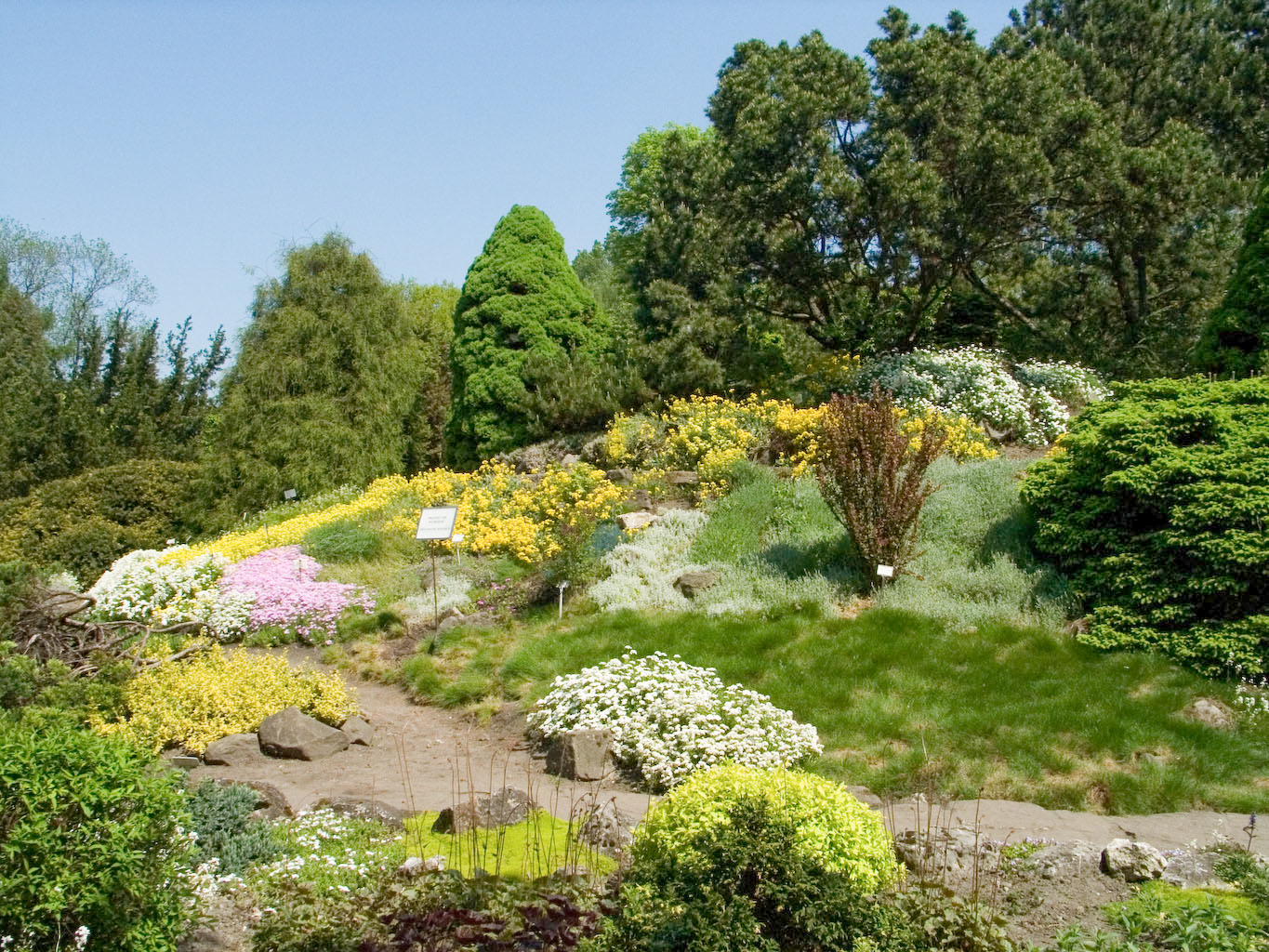
Botanical Garden

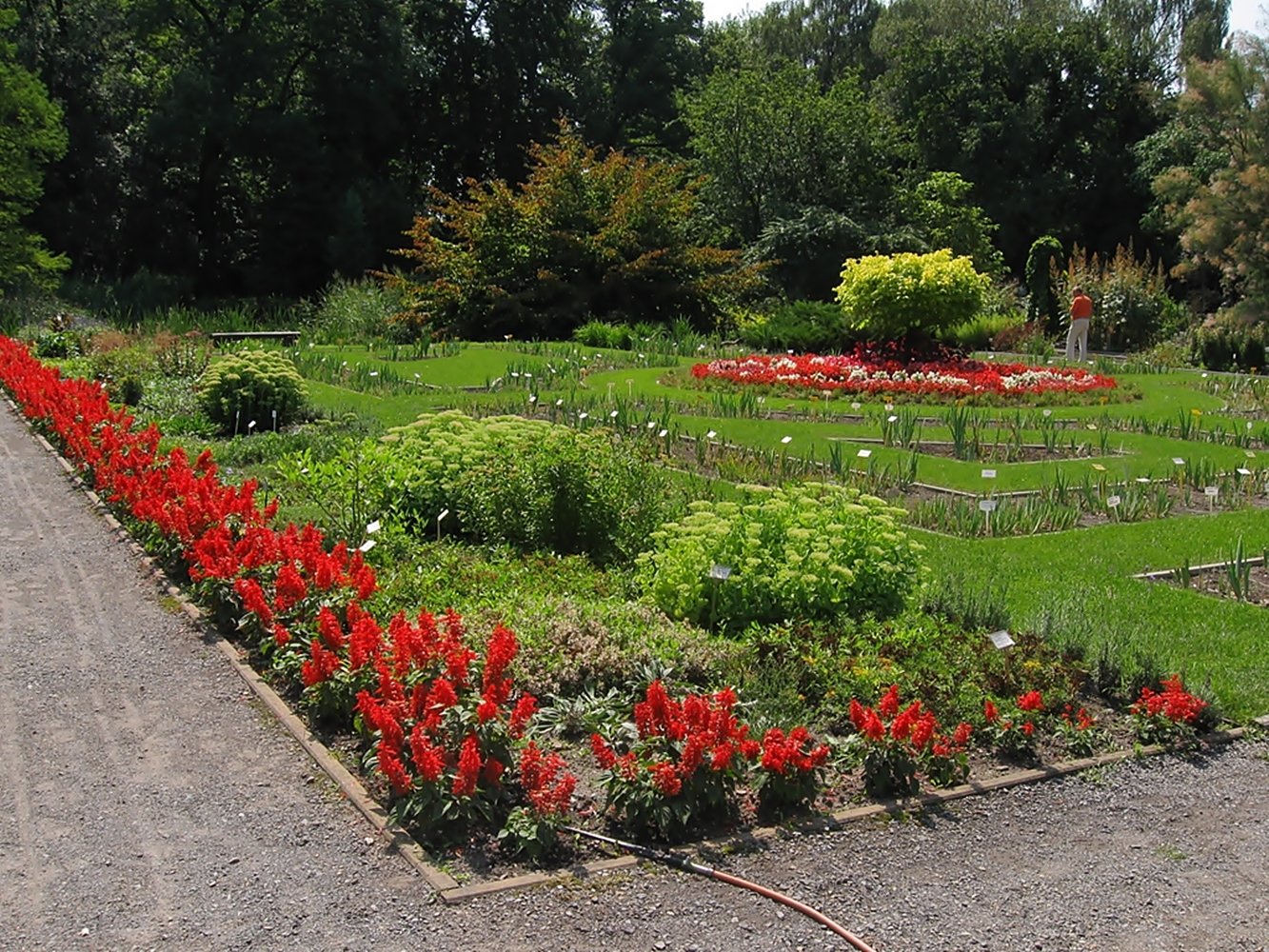
Flower species in the garden

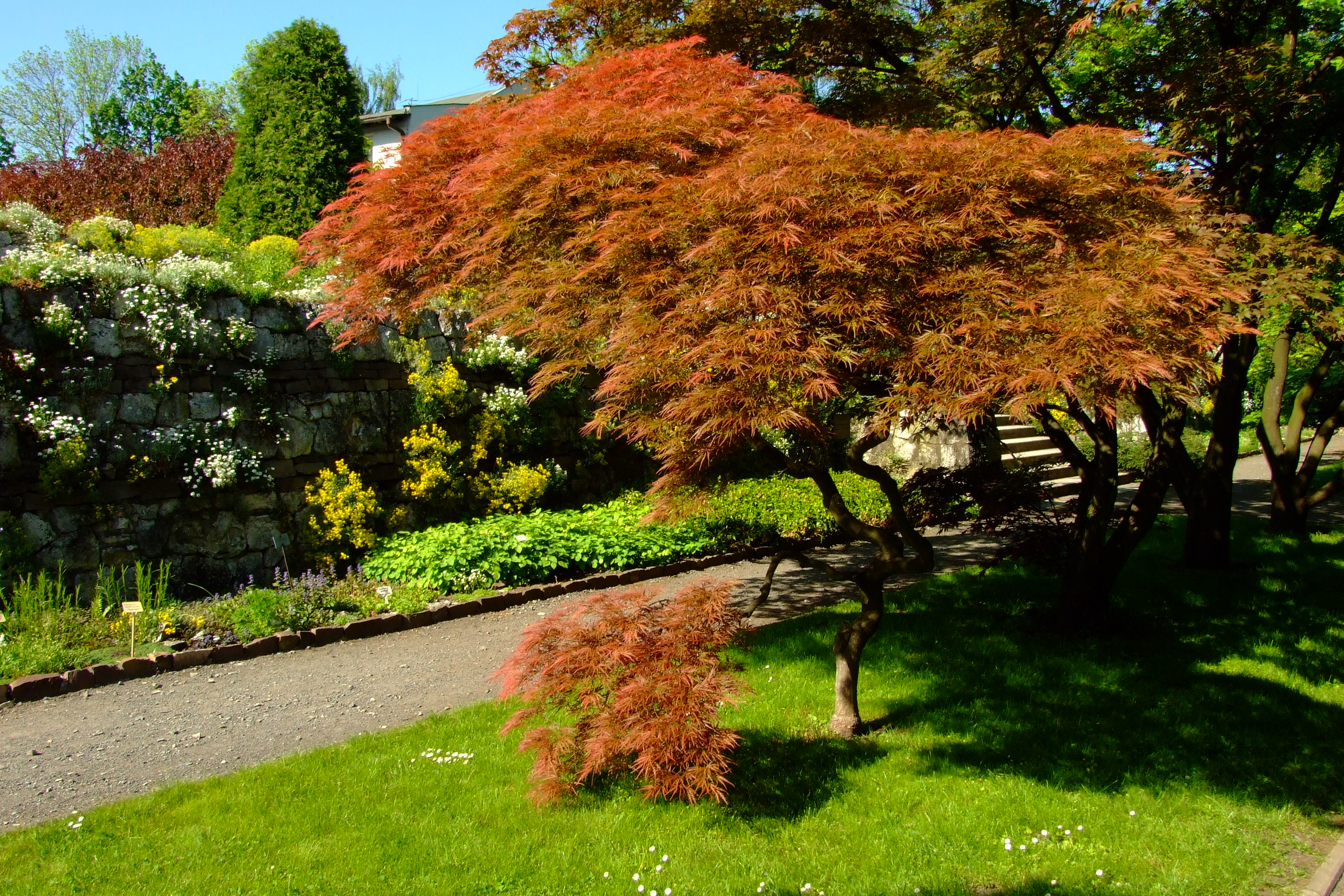
Tree species and plants in the garden

The Botanic Garden of the Jagiellonian University (Polish: Ogród Botaniczny Uniwersytetu Jagiellońskiego) is a botanical garden, located at 27 Kopernika Street in Wesoła, the former district of Kraków, Poland.

It is founded in 1783 and occupies 9.6 hectares. It belongs to the Jagiellonian University.

== History ==
Botany was taught to medical students at the Jagiellonian University from the end of the sixteenth century. However, the school did not have a test garden. The university rector, Dr. Kazimierz Stępkowskiego, writing in 1756, provided five thousand złoty for preliminary work to create a garden. The garden itself was founded in 1783 and is the oldest remaining in Poland. [1]

Kraków Botanical Garden was in place family Czartoryski, purchased in 1752 by the Jesuits. [2] [3] After the dissolution of the Order, it was transferred to the Commission of National Education, which is part of the reform of the Kraków Academy established a botanical garden as an auxiliary unit of the Faculty of Chemistry and Natural History. The area covers about 2.4 hectares initially designed as a French baroque park within which decorated collection of medicinal plants and ornamentals. Organization garden dealt with Jan Jaśkiewicz (1749–1809). In 1783, preparatory work began. The first greenhouse was erected in 1787.

The area covered by the garden area has expanded several times. The garden acquired its current area in the 1950s.

=== Buildings ===
The earliest greenhouse complex "Victoria", part of which is with the oldest glasshouse was rebuilt in the nineteenth and twentieth centuries, and was again reconstructed in 1993–1998. In 1882, the existing palm house was built until 1969. The "Jubilee" palm house was opened in 1966 alongside a group of tropical greenhouses. In 1954 came "Dutch" - low emissions, which covers collections of orchids. [4]

In 1788–1792 was edifice observatory was built, later being rebuilt through 1858–1859. The observatory has worked Jan Śniadecki, famous Kraków mathematician and astronomer, and astronomer Tadeusz Banachiewicz. Today, the building known as the Collegium Śniadeckiego houses the Institute of Botany. Built in 1792, the garden is one of the oldest meteorological stations in Poland. It has a continuous series of measurements from 1825.

Originally the site stretched from Jurydyka Wesoła, and was founded in 1639 by Katarzyna Zamoyska. In the 17th century there was a vast suburban property with a small palace of "Suburban villa". Residences surrounded by geometric, quartered parks in the southern part of the canal running from the old oxbow lakes. Reconstruction of the Observatory was designed Stanisław Zawadzki. Construction within the domes ("postrzegalnie"), and high rooms on the ground floor were used as the Botanical Gardens. In 1829-1833 on the right side of the palace gardener's house was rebuilt into a garden office. Located on the left side of the former court stables converted into apartments and the garden for the service. Another reconstruction took place in 1859, when the former palace was formed in the style of classicism. From near the palace of April 1, 1784, J. Śniadeckiego and J. Jaskiewicz organized a balloon flight [5] [6] .

=== Collections ===
Since the mid-nineteenth century, mainly because of botanist Józef Warszewicz (1812–1866) travel to the Central and South America, it begins to be developed collection of plants and orchids. Today it is the oldest and largest collection of its kind in Poland, with about 500 species.

State collection was changing depending on the political situation of the country and the development of science in the Jagiellonian University. At the end of the eighteenth century in the garden, there were about three thousand plant species, especially useful. Collection of plants declined in the early nineteenth century, and it was only in the 1820s under the direction of Alojzy Rafał Estreicher (1786–1852) that it was rebuilt. The garden gained particular fame in the 1860s, at the time of Ignacy Rafał Czerwiakowski (1808–1882) [7]. Stock declined in the late nineteenth century, and only Marian Raciborski (1863–1917), explorer of the Polish flora and Java began its restoration in the early twentieth century (founded a new rock garden, the department of genetics and plant variability). Its present appearance owes garden Władysław Szafer (1886–1970), one of the Polish botanists. Since 1991 he is the director Bogdan Zemanek, for which management was carried out repairs greenhouses, boilers, College Śniadeckiego and side buildings.

In 1976, the Botanical Garden was listed as a monument, as a valuable natural monument, a monument to the history of science, art, gardening and culture.

On 26 May 1983, during the celebrations of the 200th anniversary jubilee of the Botanical Garden, opened a permanent exhibition written by Alicja Zemanek and Jerzy Świecimski artistic project. In 1983, he established a nationwide Botany Section of the History of Polish Botanical Society, with its registered office and research program coupled with the activities of the museum.

== Departments and plant collections ==
Currently the plant collection contains approximately 5000 species and varieties from around the world. This total includes nearly 1,000 species of trees and shrubs, and more than 2,000 species and varieties of plants in greenhouses.

The Arboretum, which is part of the Gardens, contains as focused collection of trees and shrubs and covers the single largest area of the gardens. Partially composed as a park, and partly as a thematic groups - geographic or decorative. A collection of woody plants, there are about 1,000 species and varieties, the most valuable group of maples and oaks it [8] . Among the many beautiful and excellent plant reigns with about 230 years, " Jagiellonian Oak "- oak Quercus robur [9] .

The area of the Botanical Garden is divided into several sections:

- Collections of tropical plants - Greenhouses
  - Victoria - the name comes from the Royal Victoria Lily Victoria amazonica growing in the pool
  - Jubilee - built to commemorate the 600th anniversary of the Jagiellonian University in 1964
  - Dutch - the name is the type of greenhouse
- Plants Ground
  - Plants of the Bible
  - Arboretum
  - The systematics of plants
  - Plant Biology
  - Plants protected
  - Rock Garden
  - Medicinal plants and other utility
  - Ornamentals
  - Aquatic plants

== Directors, managers and distinguished staff ==
- Jan Jaśkiewicz (1749-1809) - Polish chemist, geologist and mineralogist, the first director
- Franciszek Scheidt (1759-1807) - botanist and physician
- Suibert Burchard Schivereck (1742-1806), Joseph August Schultes (1773-1831), Baltazar Hacquet (1739-1815), Joseph August Rhodius - Austrian and German professors
- 1809 - Alojzy Rafał Estreicher (1786-1852) - Polish botanist and entomologist
- Ignacy Rafał Czerwiakowski (1808-1882) - botanist, physician
- 1878 - Józef Rostafiński (1850-1928) - botanist and humanist scholar of algae and slime molds and natural history of Polish names
- Józef Piotr Brzeziński (1862-1939) - President of the Horticultural Society of Kraków, deputy director of the Botanical Garden
- Emil Godlewski senior (1847-1930) - Polish pioneer of plant physiology
- Edward Janczewski-Glinka (1846-1918) - anatomist and taxonomist
- 1912-1917 - Marian Raciborski (1863-1917) - botanist, explorer flora Polish
- 1918-1960 - Wladyslaw Szafer (1886-1970)
- William Herter - served as director during the German occupation
- 1960-1965 - Bogumił Pawłowski (1898-1971) - an expert in European mountain vegetation
- 1965-1967 - Bronisław Szafran (1897-1968) - researcher of bryophytes
- 1967-1970 - Wanda Wróbel-Stermińska (1911-1983)
- 1970-1973 - Jan Walas (1903-1991) - geographer plants and phytosociologist
- 1973-1991 - Kazimierz Szczepanek - palaeobotanist, a researcher Quaternary fossil floras
- 1991-2013 - Prof. Assoc. Bogdan Zemanek - Polish botanist, a specialist in plant geography, ecology and taxonomy of plants
- 2013-2020 - Prof. UJ Assoc. Józef Mitka - Polish botanist, a specialist in plant taxonomy and ecology
- 2020-to this day - Michał Węgrzyn

== Opening times ==
Botanical Garden is open to visitors only during the summer months, from mid-April to mid-October.

== Footnotes ==
   ↑ Jan Adamczewski, Kraków from A to Z, ISBN 83-03-03234-8 .
   ↑ Michael Horn, Guide to the sights and culture of Kraków, Warsaw-Kraków: Oxford University Press, 1993, ISBN 83-01-10989-0 .
   ↑ Ambroży Grabowski Kraków and its surroundings, Kraków, 1866
   ↑ Polish biographical dictionary, Polish Academy of Sciences, Institute of History (Polish Academy of Sciences), 1994, Volume 35
   ↑ Alicja Zemanek, exotic garden Merry, Books, 1986.
   ↑ Marek Żukow-Karczewski, Palaces city. The former palace of the Czartoryski (Observatory), "Echo of Krakow", 123 (13184) 1990.
   ↑ Andrzej Śródka, Polish scholars nineteenth and twentieth centuries: AG, in Aries, 1994
   ↑ Kazimierz Szczepanek Guide to the Botanical Garden of the Jagiellonian University in the Polish Scientific Publishers, 1985, ISBN 83-01-06432-3
   ↑ Information on the plate mounted on oak
