= Karolewo, Starogard County =

Village in Pomeranian Voivodeship, Poland

Karolewo
- Village
- Location within Poland
- Coordinates: 53°56′48″N 18°24′3″E
- Country: Poland
- Voivodeship: Pomeranian
- County: Starogard
- Gmina: Zblewo
- Population: 154
- Time zone: UTC+1 (CET)
  - Summer (DST): UTC+2 (CEST)
- Vehicle registration: GST

Karolewo [karɔˈlɛvɔ] is a village in the administrative district of Gmina Zblewo, within Starogard County, Pomeranian Voivodeship, in northern Poland. It is located within the ethnocultural region of Kociewie in the historic region of Pomerania.
