= Niegoszcz =

- Village
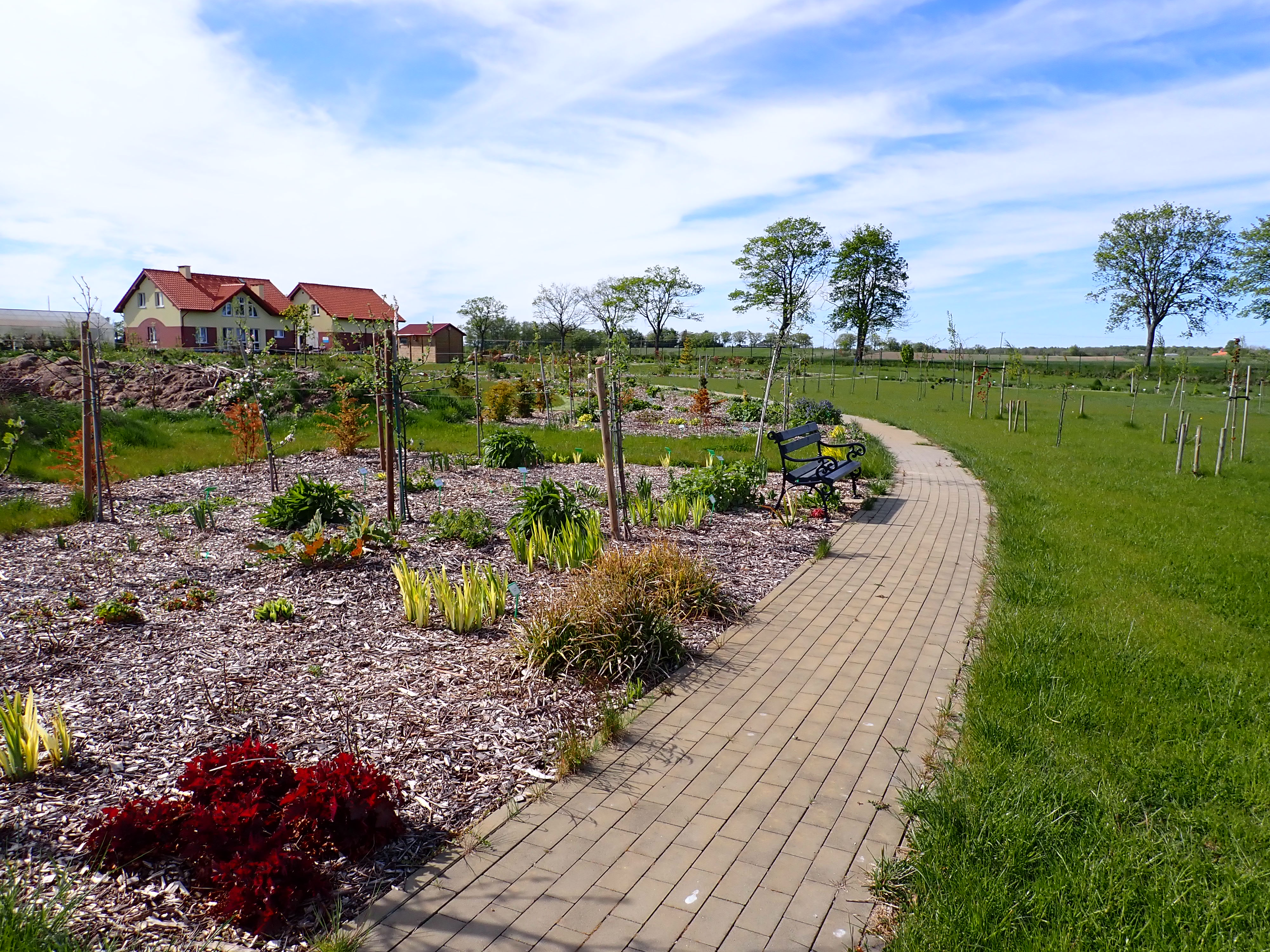

- Location within Poland
- Coordinates: 54°14′44″N 15°58′14″E
- Country: Poland
- Voivodeship: West Pomeranian
- County: Koszalin
- Gmina: Mielno
- Time zone: UTC+1 (CET)
  - Summer (DST): UTC+2 (CEST)
- Vehicle registration: ZKO

Niegoszcz [ˈɲɛɡɔʂt͡ʂ] is a village in the administrative district of Gmina Mielno, within Koszalin County, West Pomeranian Voivodeship, in north-western Poland. It lies approximately 16 km (10 mi) north-west of Koszalin and 130 km (81 mi) north-east of the regional capital Szczecin.

There is a botanical garden in Niegoszcz (see also List of botanical gardens in Poland).

== History ==
The territory became part of the emerging Polish state under its first ruler Mieszko I around 967. Following the fragmentation of Poland, it formed part of the Duchy of Pomerania until 1637.
