= Jezierce, Pomeranian Voivodeship =

Village in Pomeranian Voivodeship, Poland

Jezierce
- Village
- Location within Poland
- Coordinates: 53°59′37″N 18°20′59″E
- Country: Poland
- Voivodeship: Pomeranian
- County: Starogard
- Gmina: Zblewo
- Population: 208
- Time zone: UTC+1 (CET)
  - Summer (DST): UTC+2 (CEST)
- Vehicle registration: GST

Jezierce [jɛˈʑɛrt͡sɛ] is a village in the administrative district of Gmina Zblewo, within Starogard County, Pomeranian Voivodeship, in northern Poland. It is located within the ethnocultural region of Kociewie in the historic region of Pomerania.

Jezierce was a private church village of the monastery in Pelplin, administratively located in the Tczew County in the Pomeranian Voivodeship of the Kingdom of Poland.
