= Gmina Zblewo =

Gmina Zblewo Zblewo Commune
- Gmina
- Interactive map of Gmina Zblewo
- Coordinates (Zblewo): 53°56′5″N 18°19′46″E
- Country: Poland
- Voivodeship: Pomeranian
- County: Starogard
- Seat: Zblewo

Government
  - Wójt: Artur Herold

Area
  - Total: 137.96 km^{2} (53.27 sq mi)

Population (2022)
  - Total: 11,817
  - Density: 85.655/km^{2} (221.85/sq mi)
- Website: bip.zblewo.pl

Gmina Zblewo is a rural gmina (administrative district) in Starogard County, Pomeranian Voivodeship, in northern Poland. Its seat is the village of Zblewo, which lies approximately 14 kilometres (9 mi) west of Starogard Gdański and 52 km (32 mi) south-west of the regional capital Gdańsk.

The gmina covers an area of 137.96 square kilometres (53.3 sq mi), and, as of 2022, its total population is 11,817. The gmina's wójt is the non-aligned Artur Herold, a former professional athlete.

== Villages ==
Gmina Zblewo contains the villages and settlements of Babie Doły, Białachówko, Białachowo, Biały Bukowiec, Borzechowo, Bytonia, Cis, Jezierce, Jeziornik, Karolewo, Kleszczewo Kościerskie, Królewski Bukowiec, Lipia Góra Mała, Lisewko, Mały Bukowiec, Miradowo, Pałubinek, Pazda, Piesienica, Pinczyn, Radziejewo, Semlin, Semlinek, Stary Cis, Tomaszewo, Trosowo, Twardy Dół, Wałdówko, Wirty, Zawada and Zblewo.

== Neighbouring gminas ==
Gmina Zblewo is bordered by the gminas of Kaliska, Lubichowo, Skarszewy, Stara Kiszewa and Starogard Gdański.
