= Glinna =

- Village
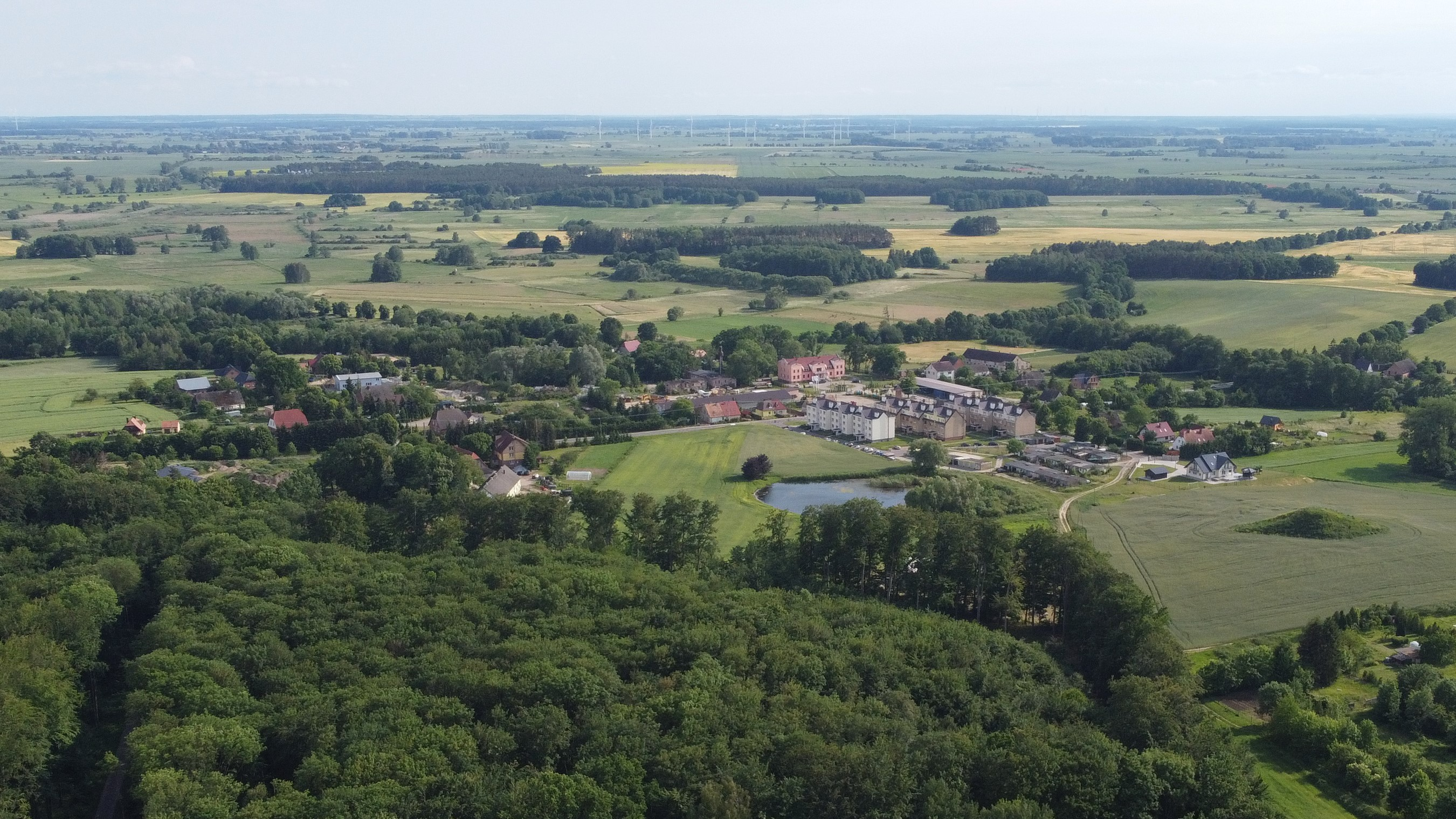
- Aerial view of Glinna

- Location within Poland
- Coordinates: 53°17′18″N 14°43′18″E
- Country: Poland
- Voivodeship: West Pomeranian
- County: Gryfino
- Gmina: Stare Czarnowo

Population
  - Total: 340
- Time zone: UTC+1 (CET)
  - Summer (DST): UTC+2 (CEST)
- Vehicle registration: PCT

Glinna [ˈɡlinna] (German: Glien) is a village in the administrative district of Gmina Stare Czarnowo, within Gryfino County, West Pomeranian Voivodeship, in north-western Poland. It lies approximately 5 km (3 mi) west of Stare Czarnowo, 16 km (10 mi) east of Gryfino, and 18 km (11 mi) south-east of the regional capital Szczecin.

The village is the location of a botanical garden (see also List of botanical gardens in Poland), and a German War Cemetery with about 13,000 graves.
