= Mały Bukowiec =

Village in Pomeranian Voivodeship, Poland

- Village
- Location within Poland
- Coordinates: 53°52′40″N 18°17′18″E
- Country: Poland
- Voivodeship: Pomeranian
- County: Starogard
- Gmina: Zblewo
- Highest elevation: 124 m (407 ft)
- Lowest elevation: 107 m (351 ft)
- Population: 77
- Time zone: UTC+1 (CET)
  - Summer (DST): UTC+2 (CEST)
- Vehicle registration: GST

Mały Bukowiec [ˈmawɨ buˈkɔvjɛt͡s] is a village in the administrative district of Gmina Zblewo, within Starogard County, Pomeranian Voivodeship, in northern Poland. It is located within the ethnocultural region of Kociewie in the historic region of Pomerania.
