= Kleszczewo Kościerskie =

Village in Pomeranian Voivodeship, Poland

- Village
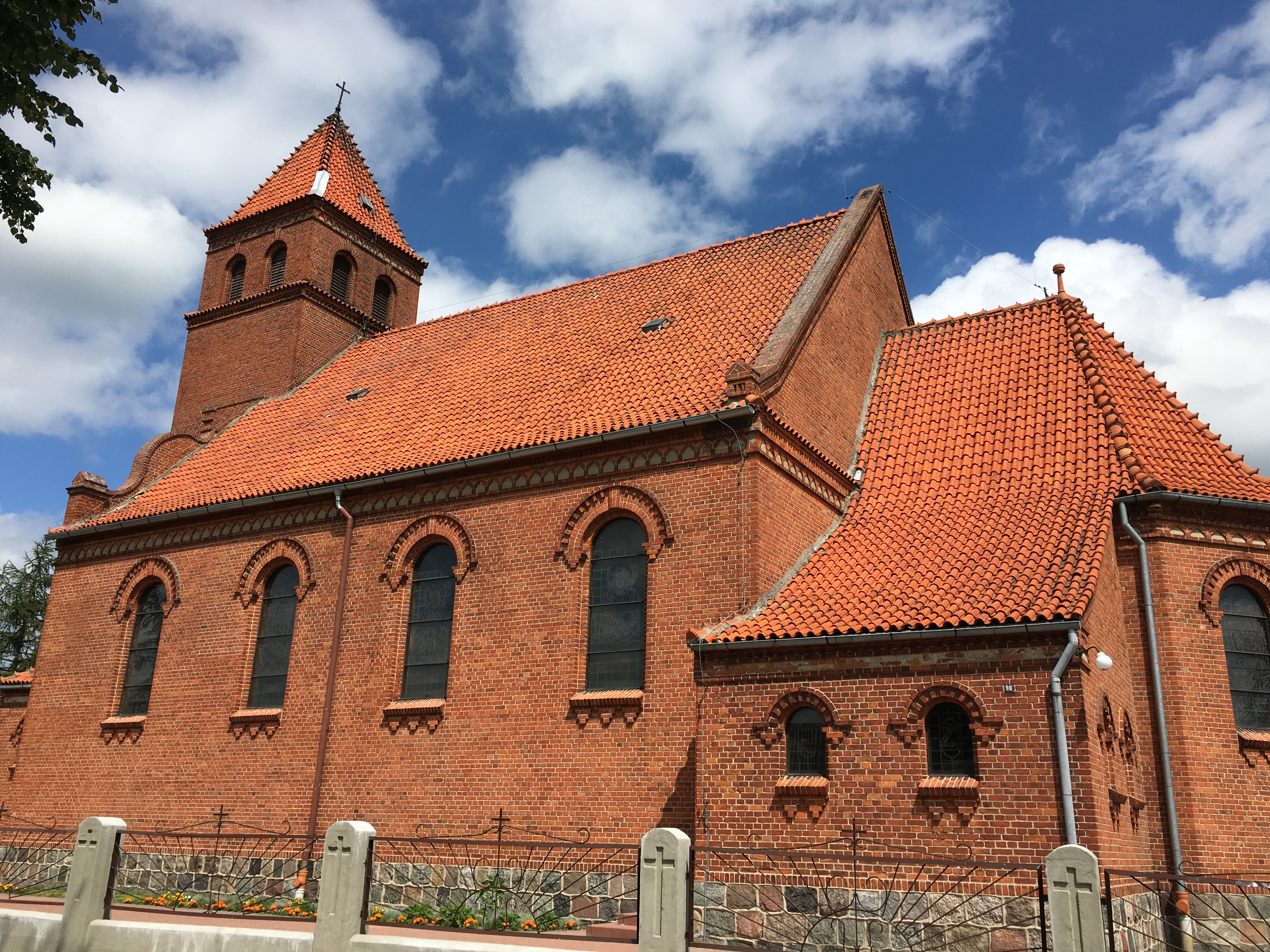
- Church of St. John the Baptist in Kleszczewo Kościerskie

- Location within Poland
- Coordinates: 53°59′44″N 18°23′32″E
- Country: Poland
- Voivodeship: Pomeranian
- County: Starogard
- Gmina: Zblewo
- Highest elevation: 136 m (446 ft)
- Lowest elevation: 111 m (364 ft)
- Population: 944
- Time zone: UTC+1 (CET)
  - Summer (DST): UTC+2 (CEST)
- Vehicle registration: GST

Kleszczewo Kościerskie [klɛʂˈt͡ʂɛvɔ kɔɕˈt͡ɕɛrskʲɛ] is a village in the administrative district of Gmina Zblewo, within Starogard County, Pomeranian Voivodeship, in northern Poland. It is located within the ethnocultural region of Kociewie in the historic region of Pomerania.

Kleszczewo was a private church village of the monastery in Pelplin, administratively located in the Tczew County in the Pomeranian Voivodeship of the Kingdom of Poland.
