= Radziejewo, Pomeranian Voivodeship =

Village in Pomeranian Voivodeship, Poland

Radziejewo
- Village
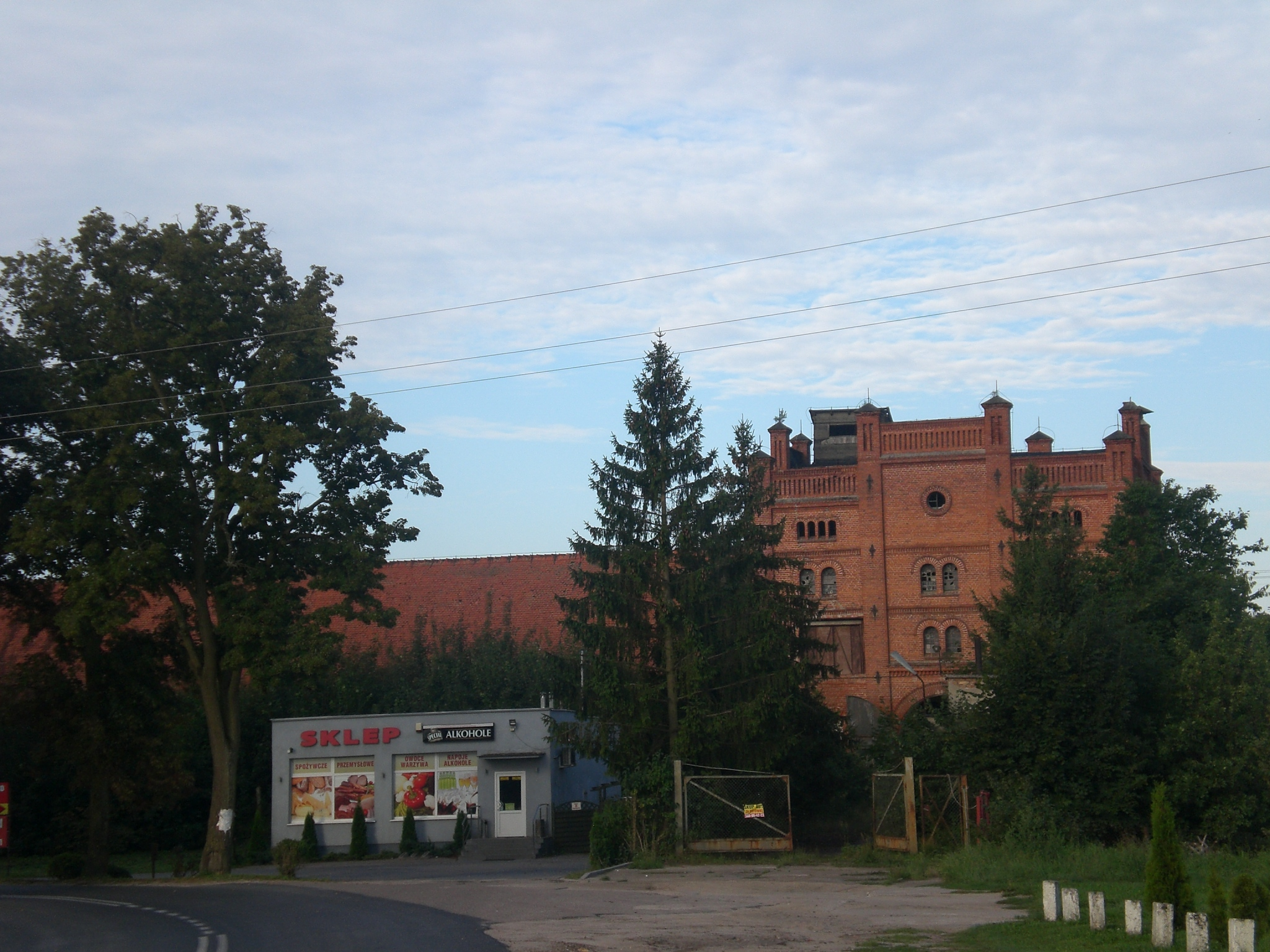
- The village shop

- Location within Poland
- Coordinates: 53°55′0″N 18°24′8″E
- Country: Poland
- Voivodeship: Pomeranian
- County: Starogard
- Gmina: Zblewo

Population
  - Total: 310
- Time zone: UTC+1 (CET)
  - Summer (DST): UTC+2 (CEST)
- Vehicle registration: GST

Radziejewo [rad͡ʑɛˈjɛvɔ] is a village in the administrative district of Gmina Zblewo, within Starogard County, Pomeranian Voivodeship, in northern Poland. It is located in the ethnocultural region of Kociewie in the historic region of Pomerania.
