= Bytonia =

Village in Pomeranian Voivodeship, Poland

- Village
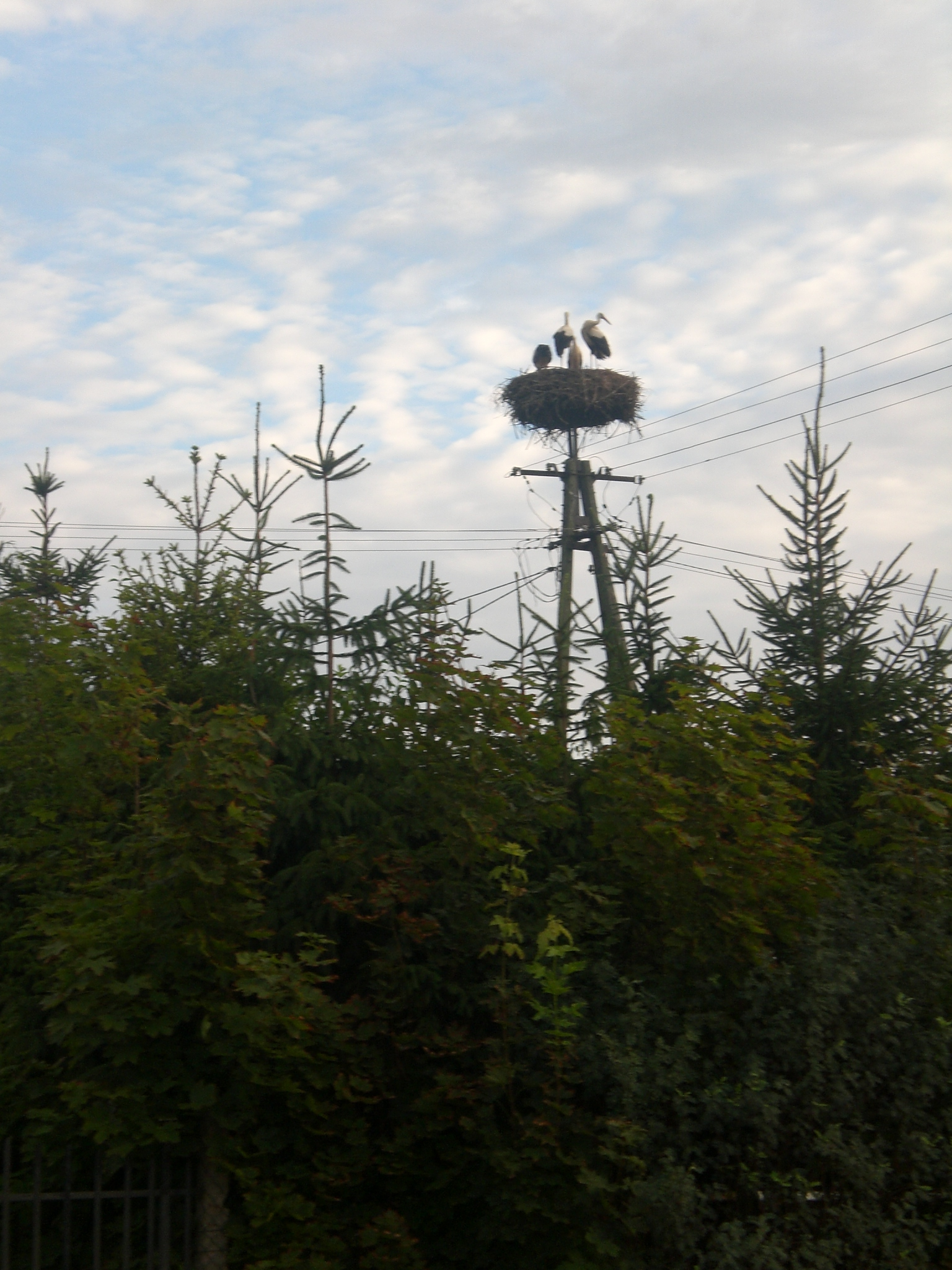
- A white stork’s nest in Bytonia

- Location within Poland
- Coordinates: 53°55′6″N 18°16′43″E
- Country: Poland
- Voivodeship: Pomeranian
- County: Starogard
- Gmina: Zblewo
- Highest elevation: 136 m (446 ft)
- Lowest elevation: 120 m (390 ft)
- Population: 966
- Time zone: UTC+1 (CET)
  - Summer (DST): UTC+2 (CEST)
- Vehicle registration: GST

Bytonia [bɨˈtɔɲa] is a village in the administrative district of Gmina Zblewo, within Starogard County, Pomeranian Voivodeship, in northern Poland. It is located within the ethnocultural region of Kociewie in the historic region of Pomerania.

== History ==
Bytonia was a royal village of the Polish Crown, administratively located in the Tczew County in the Pomeranian Voivodeship. It was annexed by Prussia in the First Partition of Poland in 1772, and restored to Poland, after Poland regained independence in 1918.
