= Wałdówko, Pomeranian Voivodeship =

Village in Pomeranian Voivodeship, Poland

Wałdówko
- Village
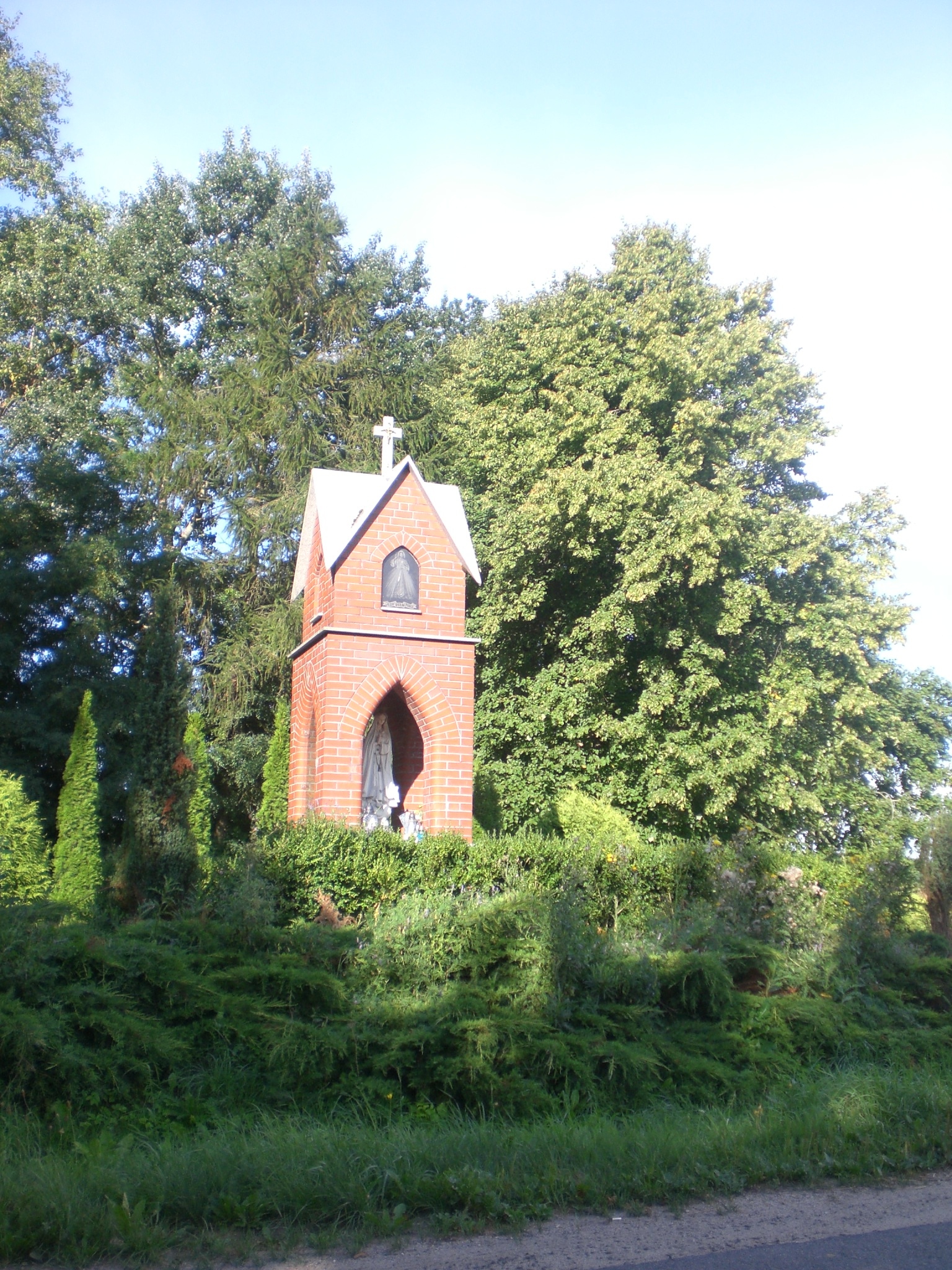
- Wayside shrine in Wałdówko

- Location within Poland
- Coordinates: 54°0′54″N 18°24′23″E
- Country: Poland
- Voivodeship: Pomeranian
- County: Starogard
- Gmina: Zblewo
- Population: 39
- Time zone: UTC+1 (CET)
  - Summer (DST): UTC+2 (CEST)
- Vehicle registration: GST

Wałdówko [vau̯ˈdufkɔ] is a village in the administrative district of Gmina Zblewo, within Starogard County, Pomeranian Voivodeship, in northern Poland. It is located within the ethnocultural region of Kociewie in the historic region of Pomerania.

Wałdówko was a private church village of the monastery in Pelplin, administratively located in the Tczew County in the Pomeranian Voivodeship of the Polish Crown.
