= Lipia Góra Mała =

Village in Pomeranian Voivodeship, Poland

- Village
- Location within Poland
- Coordinates: 54°0′18″N 18°25′1″E
- Country: Poland
- Voivodeship: Pomeranian
- County: Starogard
- Gmina: Zblewo
- Population: 39
- Time zone: UTC+1 (CET)
  - Summer (DST): UTC+2 (CEST)
- Vehicle registration: GST

Lipia Góra Mała [ˈlipja ˈɡura ˈmawa] is a village in the administrative district of Gmina Zblewo, within Starogard County, Pomeranian Voivodeship, in northern Poland. It is located within the ethnocultural region of Kociewie in the historic region of Pomerania.
