= Miradowo =

Village in Pomeranian Voivodeship, Poland

- Village
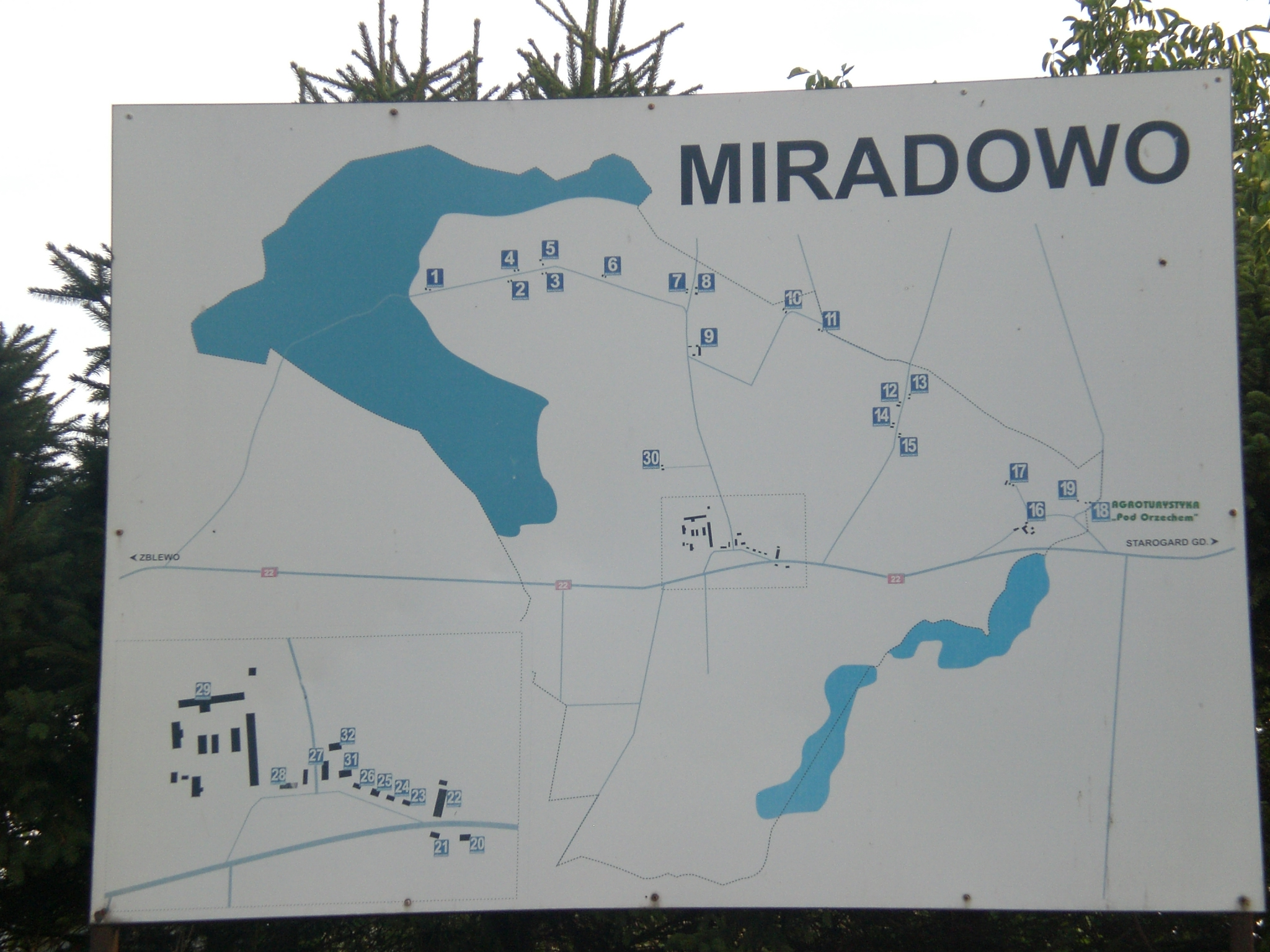
- A map of the village

- Location within Poland
- Coordinates: 53°57′47″N 18°19′18″E
- Country: Poland
- Voivodeship: Pomeranian
- County: Starogard
- Gmina: Zblewo
- Highest elevation: 131 m (430 ft)
- Lowest elevation: 104 m (341 ft)
- Population: 335
- Time zone: UTC+1 (CET)
  - Summer (DST): UTC+2 (CEST)
- Vehicle registration: GST

Miradowo [miraˈdɔvɔ] is a village in the administrative district of Gmina Zblewo, within Starogard County, Pomeranian Voivodeship, in northern Poland. It is located within the ethnocultural region of Kociewie in the historic region of Pomerania.
