= Cis, Pomeranian Voivodeship =

Village in Kociewie

Cis
- Village
- Location within Poland
- Coordinates: 53°56′21″N 18°15′6″E
- Country: Poland
- Voivodeship: Pomeranian
- County: Starogard
- Gmina: Zblewo
- Population: 128
- SIMC: 0176957

Cis [ˈnɔvɨ ˈt͡ɕis] is a village in the administrative district of Gmina Zblewo, within Starogard County, Pomeranian Voivodeship, in northern Poland. From 2015 the settlement's name was officially changed from Nowy Cis to its current one.
