= Białachowo =

Village in Pomeranian Voivodeship, Poland

- Village
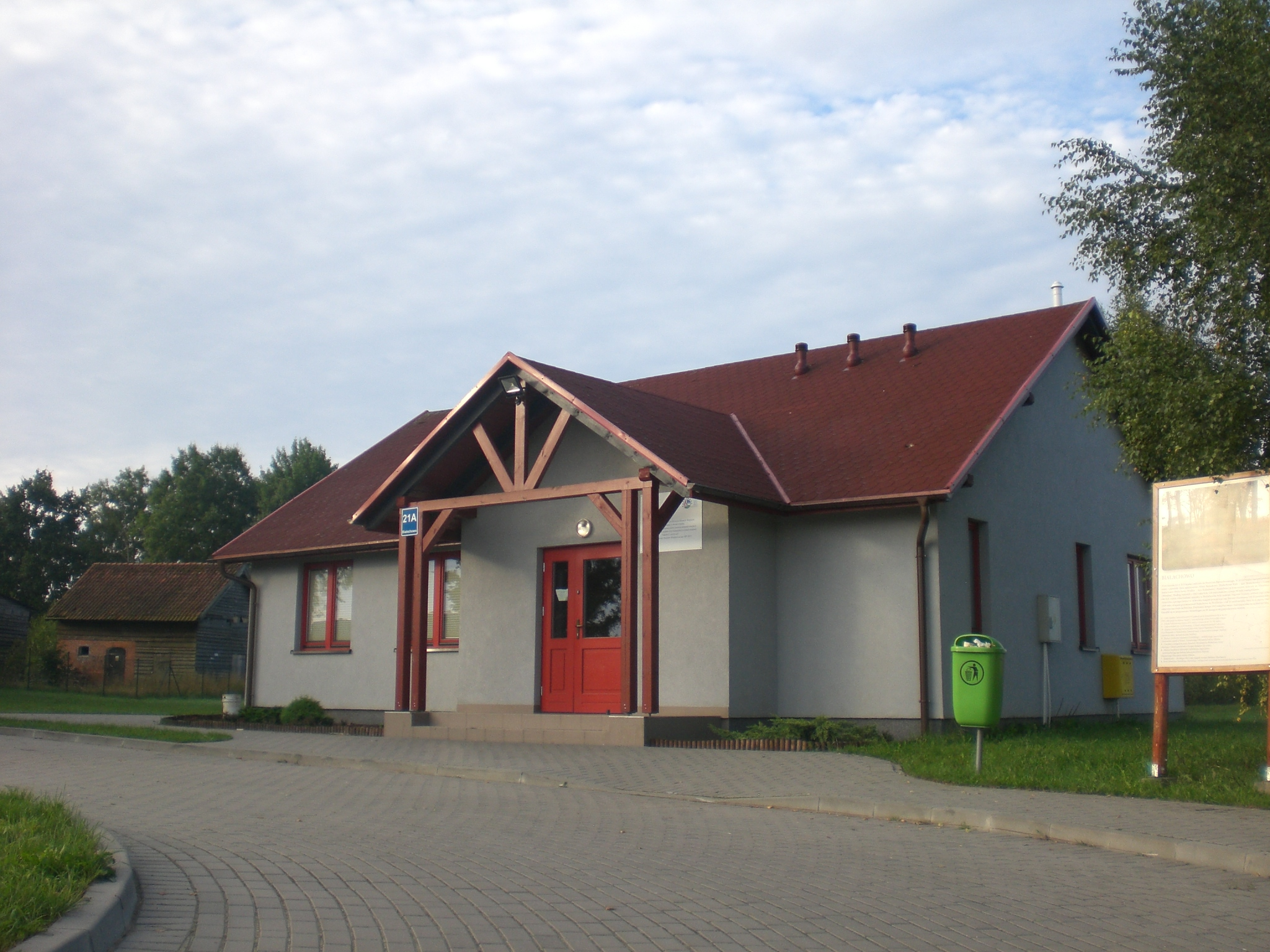
- House in Białachowo

- Location within Poland
- Coordinates: 53°55′9″N 18°21′15″E
- Country: Poland
- Voivodeship: Pomeranian
- County: Starogard
- Gmina: Zblewo

Population
  - Total: 229
- Time zone: UTC+1 (CET)
  - Summer (DST): UTC+2 (CEST)
- Vehicle registration: GST

Białachowo [bjawaˈxɔvɔ] is a village in the administrative district of Gmina Zblewo, within Starogard County, Pomeranian Voivodeship, in northern Poland. It is located in the ethnocultural region of Kociewie in the historic region of Pomerania.
