= Semlin, Poland =

Village in Pomeranian Voivodeship, Poland

Semlin
- Village
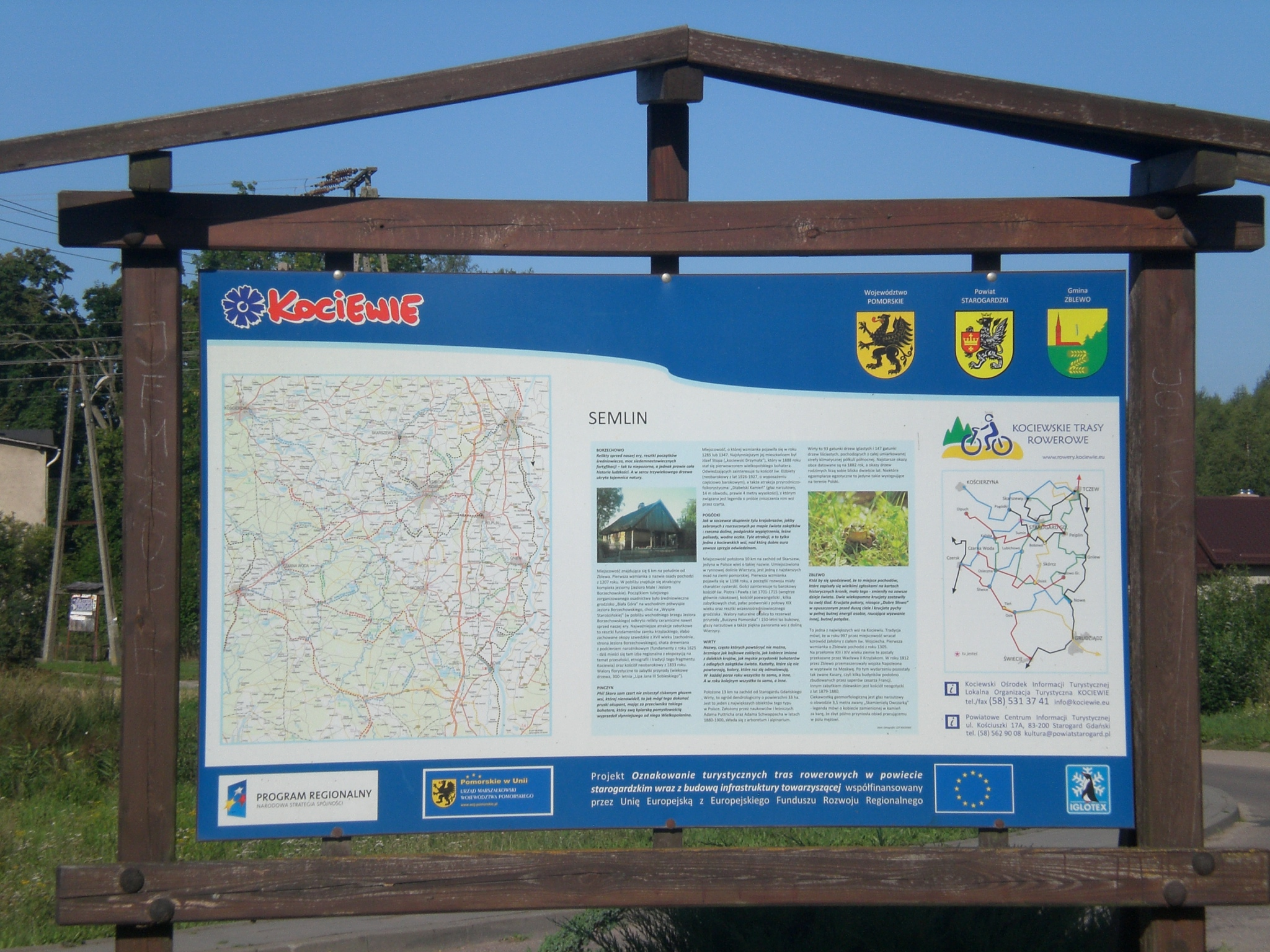
- An information board in the village, 2018

- Location within Poland
- Coordinates: 53°58′59″N 18°23′37″E
- Country: Poland
- Voivodeship: Pomeranian
- County: Starogard
- Gmina: Zblewo
- Highest elevation: 135 m (443 ft)
- Lowest elevation: 110 m (360 ft)
- Population: 466
- Time zone: UTC+1 (CET)
  - Summer (DST): UTC+2 (CEST)
- Vehicle registration: GST

Semlin [ˈsɛmlin] is a village in the administrative district of Gmina Zblewo, within Starogard County, Pomeranian Voivodeship, in northern Poland. It is located within the ethnocultural region of Kociewie in the historic region of Pomerania.

Semlin was a royal village of the Polish Crown, administratively located in the Tczew County in the Pomeranian Voivodeship.
