= Wirty =

Village in Pomeranian Voivodeship, Poland

- Settlement
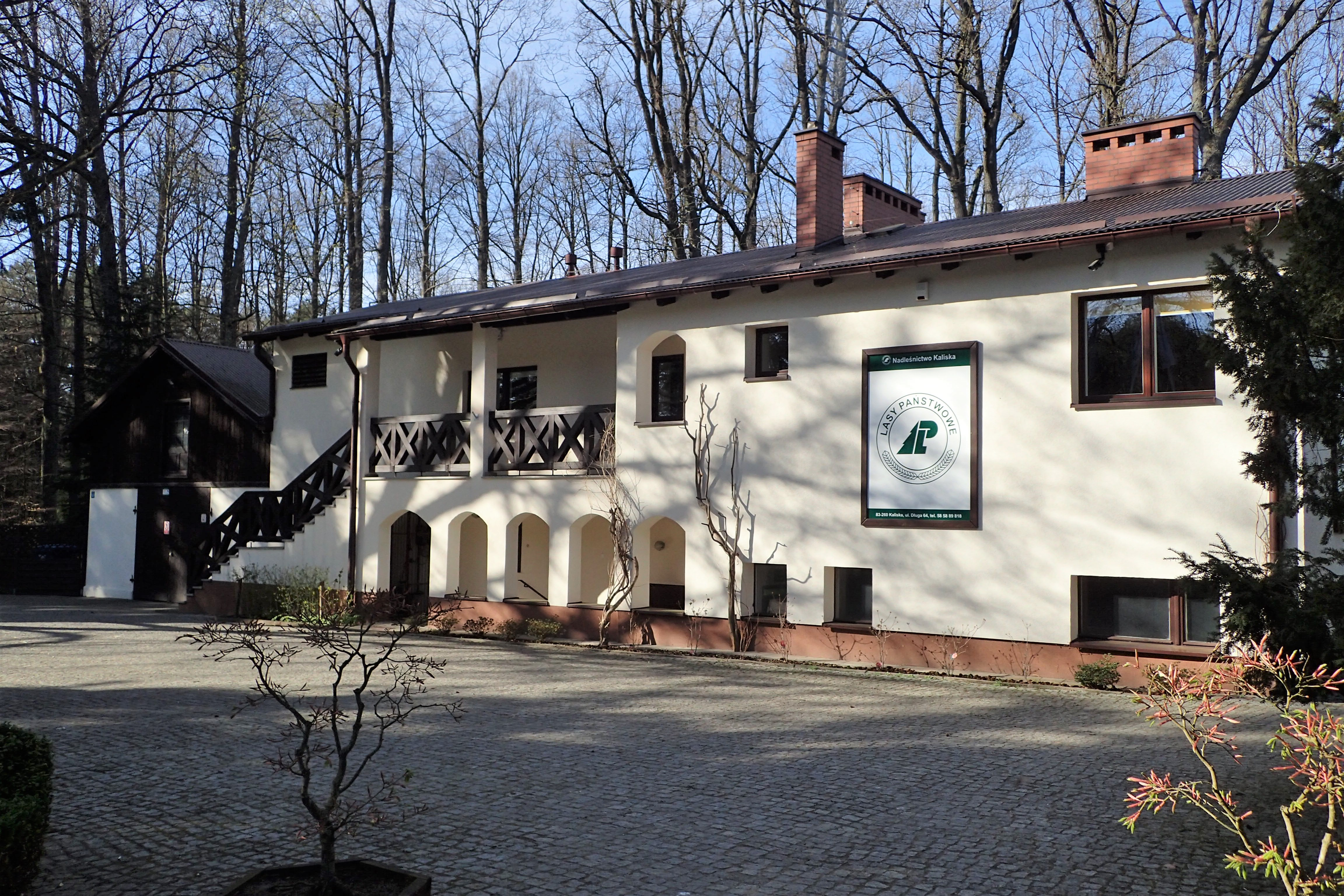
- The arboretum in Wirty

- Location within Poland
- Coordinates: 53°53′38″N 18°22′38″E
- Country: Poland
- Voivodeship: Pomeranian
- County: Starogard
- Gmina: Zblewo

Population
  - Total: 34
- Time zone: UTC+1 (CET)
  - Summer (DST): UTC+2 (CEST)
- Vehicle registration: GST

Wirty [ˈvirtɨ] is a settlement in the administrative district of Gmina Zblewo, within Starogard County, Pomeranian Voivodeship, in northern Poland. It is located in the ethnocultural region of Kociewie in the historic region of Pomerania. In the village there is a 33.61 ha arboretum, Arboretum Wirty that was founded in 1875.
