= Bogumił Pawłowski =

Polish botanist (1898–1971)

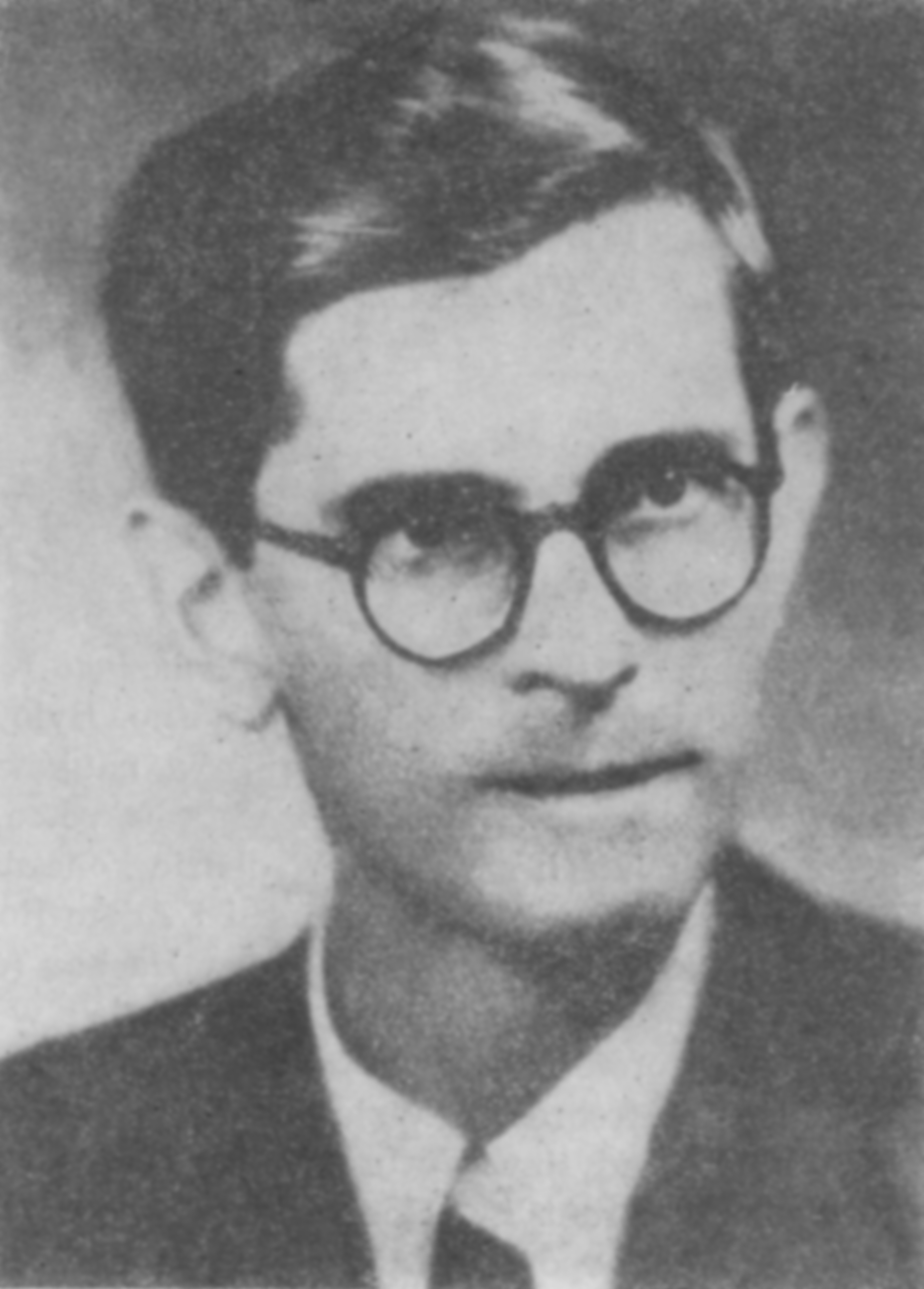
Bogumił Pawłowski

Bogumił Pawłowski (born 1898, died 1971) was a Polish botanist, a member of the Polish Academy of Sciences, professor at the Jagiellonian University, and director of the Institute of Botany of the Academy of Sciences in Kraków.

His interests included plant taxonomy, floristics, phytogeography, and phytosociology.

He was the author or co-author of over 100 papers in the field of botany, such as Flora Polska (with Władysław Szafer and Stanisław Kulczyński) describing Polish vegetation. He was also the regional adviser for Poland on the Flora Europaea project.

With Władysław Szafer he edited and distributed the exsiccata Rośliny Polskie wydawnictwa rozpoczętego przez M. Raciborskiego Seria II. Plantae Poloniae exsiccatae ab Instituto et Horto Botanico Universitatis Jagellonicae edita (1930-1939). The following series Rośliny Polskie. Plantae Poloniae exsiccatae Seria II ab Instituto Botanico Universitatis Jagellonicae et Instituto Botanico Academiae Scientiarum Polonae edita (1957-1961) was co-edited by Jan Kornaś and Adam Jasiewicz.
