= Arboretum Wirty =

Coordinates: 53°54′N 18°23′E

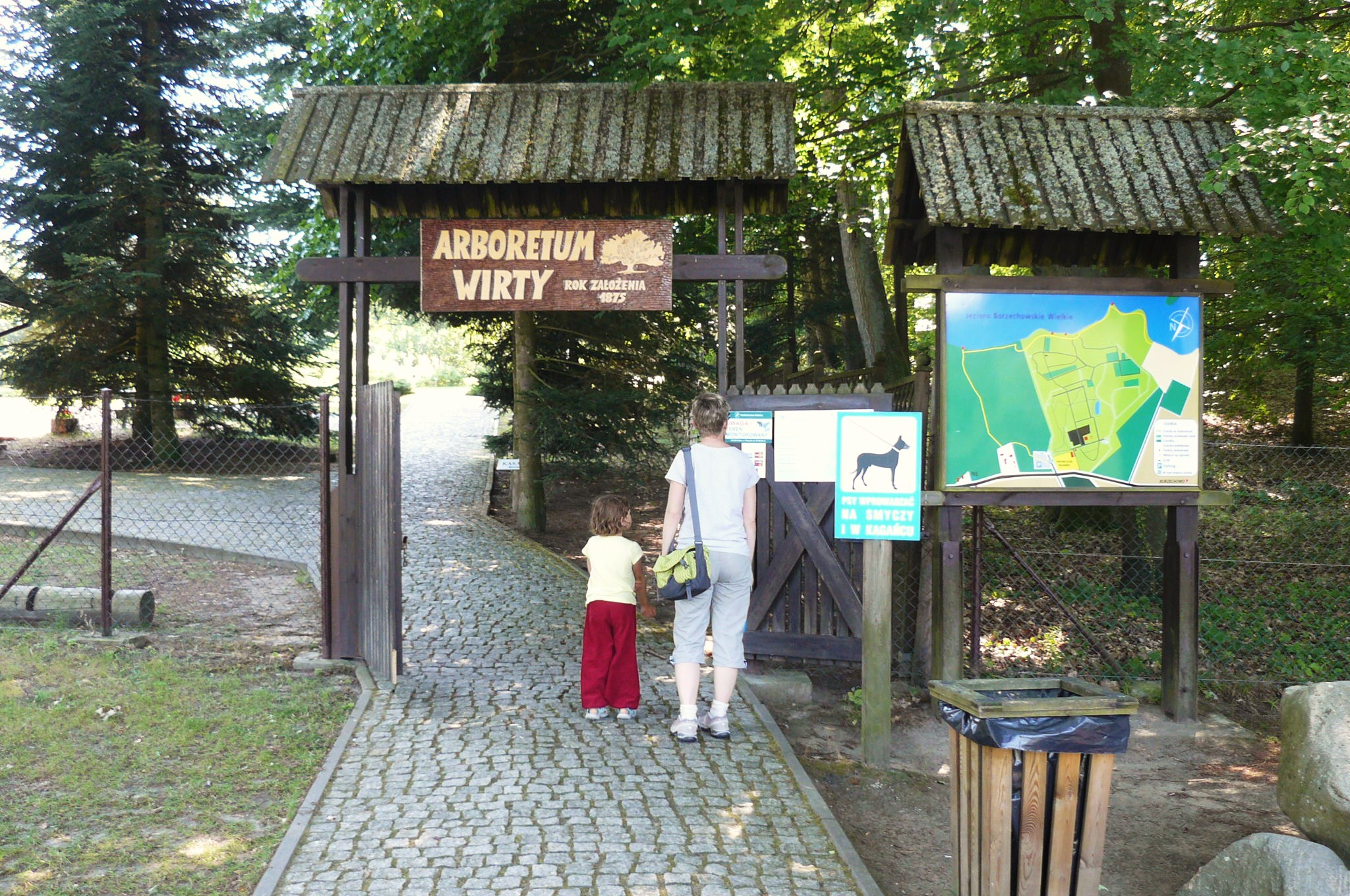
Arboretum Wirty

Arboretum Wirty - an arboretum in northern Poland, near Wirty, by the Borzechowskie Lake.

The garden was founded in 1875 by Adam Putrich, a forest ranger of the neighbouring woods, together with prof Adam Schwappach. It occupies area of 33.61 ha, gathering over 450 species of various trees and bushes. Throughout the last 20 years, a row of new seedlings has been brought to the park, enriching the trees collection with many new species, especially the Far-Eastern ones. Two of the attractions of the park are the sightseeing and didactic paths, which favours ecological educations. Now, Wirty are one of the oldest and the most interesting such places in Poland.
