= Orle Botanical Garden =

Coordinates: 54°24′39″N 18°33′54″E

- Interactive map of Orle Botanical Garden
- Type: Botanical
- Location: Orle, Poland
- Area: 90 hectares (220 acres)
- Opened: 195

Orle Botanical Garden – was founded in 1995 is located around Orle village. It was established as a botanical garden in 2010 by the Director-General for the Environment Protection. The total area of the Garden is 90 ha and there are over two thousand trees and schrubs of various species. The Garden’s Director is Maria Buzalska. The Garden is being constantly developed and thousands of plants have been planted there since its founding. From the very beginning the scientific supervision has been provided by professor Urszula Nawrocka-Grześkowiak from the Dendrology and Green Area Shaping Department of the West-Pomeranian University of Szczecin.

== Location ==
The Garden is located in the Kaszuby Sub-region of the Pomerania Region and not far of the Wdzydze Scenery Park. It can be accessed by the A1 highway that is just 35 kilometers away.

== Sections and collections of plants ==
The area of the botanical garden is divided into two parts: a private one that is closed for the external visitors and a public one that can be accessed by the groups and people interested in seeing it. The specific sections of the garden are divided by the paved roads and paths enabling the visitors to easily reach all the plants. Currently, over 4000 of species of trees and bushes as well as 450 species of perennials are growing in the dendrological garden. The collection is a significant aid to the dendrologists in marking the separate species of plants. It is also a touristic attraction and an educational and leisure spot for the visitors.

There are big collections of trees of the following species in the garden: oak, maple, beech, chestnut, birch, dogwood, magnolia, mountain ash, snowball tree, fir,(Chamaecyparis sp.), ginkgo tree juniper, spruce, pine.

In the botanical garden you may find:

=== Gardens ===
- Chinese garden (water garden)
- Herbal garden (four seasons)

=== Glens ===
- A mysterious Glen
- A moist Glen

=== Collections ===
- Beeches
- Oaks
- Maples
- Birches
- Chestnuts
- Ginkgo trees
- Pine-trees
