= Władysław Szafer =

Polish botanist (1886–1970)

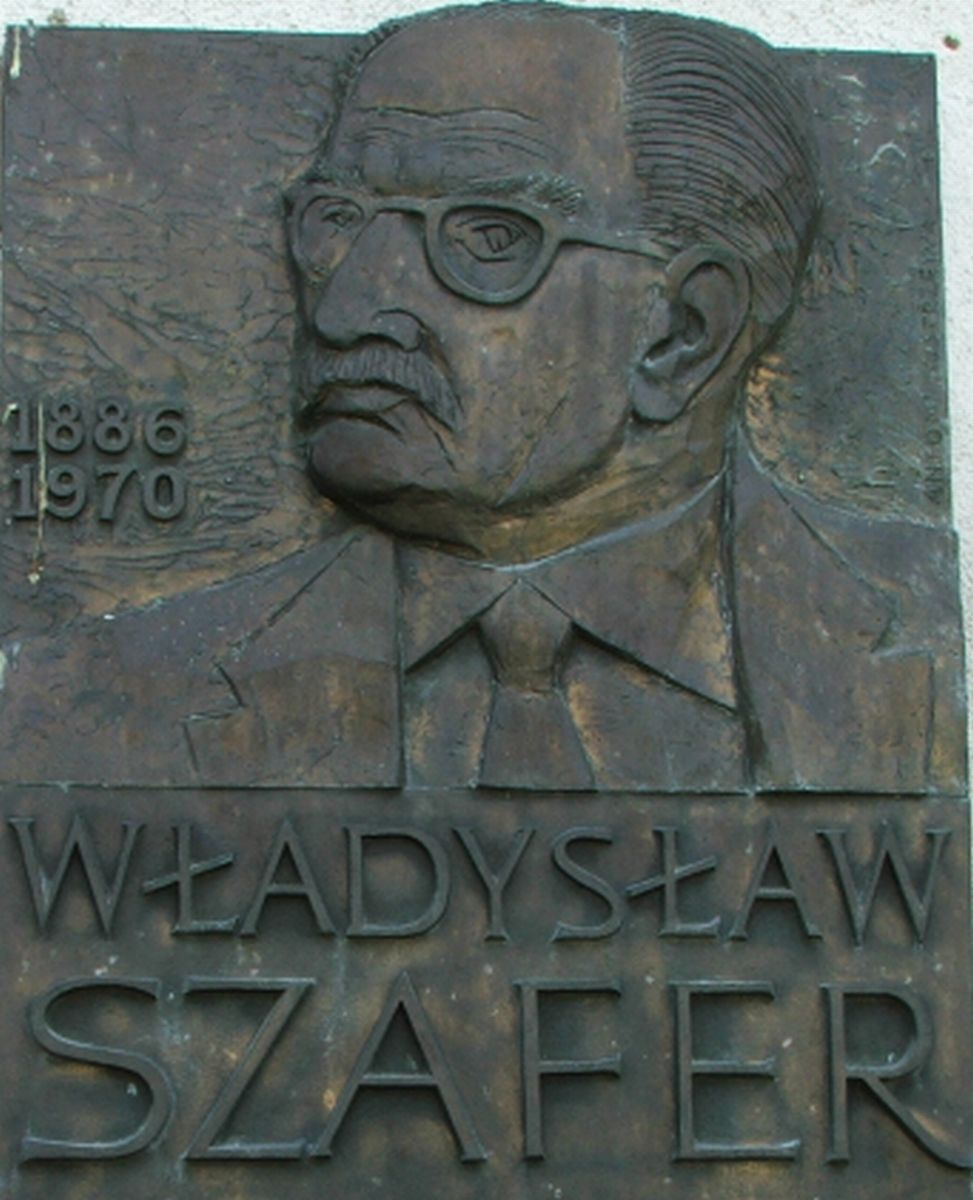

Prof Władysław Szafer PAS HFRSE (July 23, 1886 – November 16, 1970) was a Polish botanist, palaeobotanist, quaternary geologist and professor of botany at the Jagiellonian University in Kraków. He was a world pioneer in nature conservation.

Many streets and public buildings in Polish towns and cities are named after Szafer.

== Life ==
He was born in Sosnowiec on 23 July 1886.

He studied Science at the Universal School in Mielec. He then studied Botany under Prof Wilhem Friedberg in Rzeszów, graduating Junior High School in 1905. This allowed him to study botany at the University of Vienna under Prof Richard Wettstein. Winning a scholarship from the Vienna Ministry of Education he did practical studies at the Biological Research Station in Trieste. He then undertook postgraduate studies at the University of Lviv, gaining his first doctorate (PhD) in 1910. He then did further studies in pedology and dendrology at the universities of Munich and Vienna before returning to Lviv to lecture at the Higher School of Forests.

In the First World War he joined the Polish Eastern Legion as an NCO.

In 1917 he returned to academia as a lecturer at the Jagiellonian University, becoming a full professor in 1920. He served as Rector of the university 1936 to 1938.

In 1919 he married Janina Jentys. They had three children: Tadeusz Szafer, a professor of architecture; Anna Szafer, a teacher and artist; and Stanislaw Szafer.

He was founder and first chairman of the Kraków branch of the Polish Academy of Sciences (PAS).

He died in Kraków on 16 November 1970. He is buried in Rakowicki Cemetery.

== National Parks founded or caused by Szafer ==
- Pieninski
- Bialowieski
- Swietokrzyski
- Babiogorski
- Tatrzanski
- Ojcowski

== Main publications ==
- Polish Flora
- Outline of Botany (1947)
- Outline of Plant Geography (1949)
- Outline of Palaeobotany (1952)
- Polish Plants (1953)
- Secrets of Flowers (1956)
- Flowers in Nature and Art (1958)
- Protected Plant Species in Poland (1958)
- The History of Botany in Kraków (1964)

With Bogumił Pawłowski he edited and distributed the exsiccata Rośliny Polskie wydawnictwa rozpoczętego przez M. Raciborskiego Seria II. Plantae Poloniae exsiccatae ab Instituto et Horto Botanico Universitatis Jagellonicae edita (1930-1939). This series is the continuation of Flora Polonica exsiccata. Rośliny Polskie (1911), issued by Marian Raciborski.
