= Człuchów =

Town in Pomeranian Voivodeship, Poland

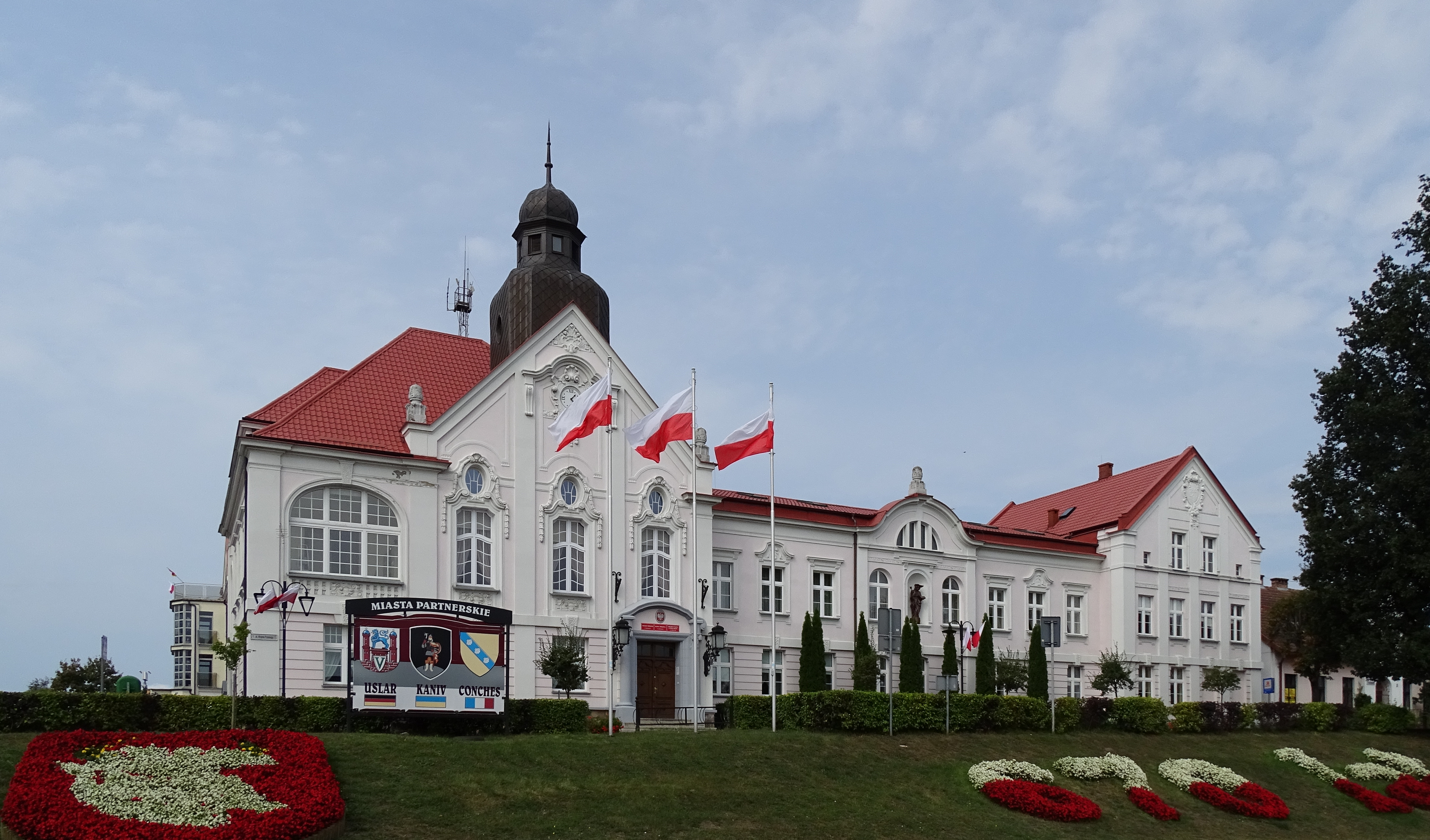
- Town Hall

- Coat of arms

- Location within Poland
- Coordinates: 53°39′N 17°22′E
- Country: Poland
- Voivodeship: Pomeranian
- County: Człuchów
- Gmina: Człuchów (urban gmina)
- Established: 12th century
- Town rights: 1348

Government
  - Mayor: Ryszard Szybajło

Area
  - Total: 12.48 km^{2} (4.82 sq mi)
- Elevation: 160 m (520 ft)

Population (31 December 2021)
  - Total: 13,350
  - Density: 1,070/km^{2} (2,771/sq mi)
- Time zone: UTC+1 (CET)
  - Summer (DST): UTC+2 (CEST)
- Postal code: 77-300
- Area code: +48 59
- Vehicle registration: GCZ
- Website: https://www.czluchow.eu/

Człuchów ([ˈt͡ʂwuxuf]; Kashubian: Człuchòwò, Człochòwo, or Człëchòwò; German: Schlochau) is a town in the region of Gdańsk Pomerania, northern Poland, with 13,350 inhabitants as of December 2021. It is the capital of Człuchów County in the Pomeranian Voivodeship.

== Location ==
Człuchów lies in a forested area in the southwest of the Pomeranian Voivodeship, at the intersection of Highway 25 from Koszalin to Bydgoszcz and Highway 22 from Gorzów Wielkopolski to Elbląg. The nearest city is Chojnice, 15 kilometres (9 miles) to the east. There are four lakes within the town limits: Urzędowe, Miejskie, Miejskie Małe, Rychnowskie.

== History ==
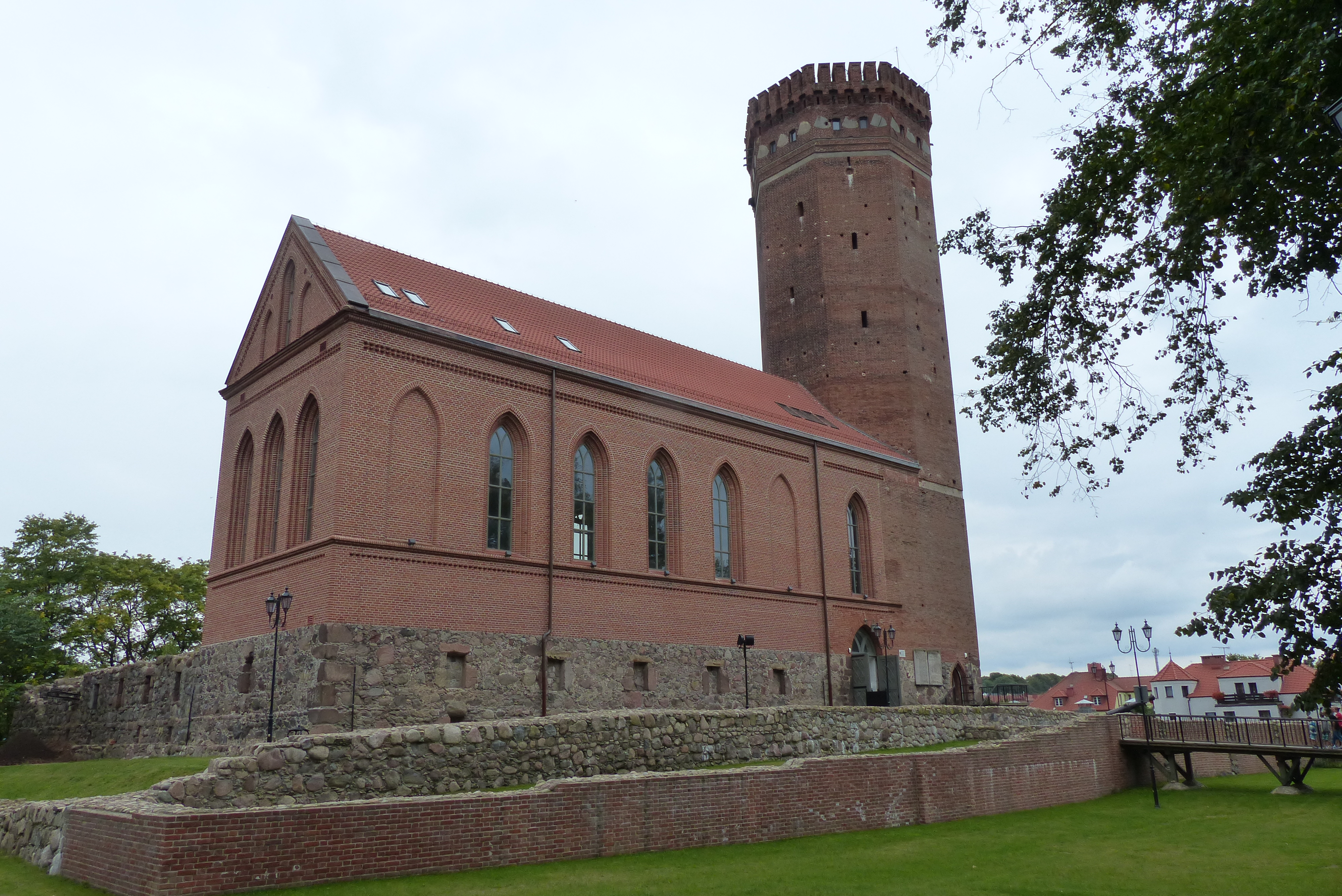
Człuchów Castle

Human settlement in Człuchów dates back to prehistoric times. Several traces of the Lusatian and Pomeranian cultures were discovered during archaeological excavations within the town limits. The territory became part of the emerging Polish state in the 10th century under its first historic ruler Mieszko I. By the beginning of the 13th century, Człuchów was a small settlement located at the intersection of two trade routes. In 1312 the Teutonic Knights purchased the settlement for 250 silver marks from Nicholas of Poniec, a son of the voivode of Kalisz. The Order began constructing a fortress known as Schlochau on a hill east of the settlement; the fortress, the Order's second-largest after Marienburg (Malbork), was completed in 1367. By 1323 it was used as a komturei (bailiwick) by the crusaders and consisted of three support buildings and the main castle. The fortress was so well-developed that Grand Master Heinrich von Dusemer granted the town Kulm law in 1348. In 1454, King Casimir IV Jagiellon reincorporated the town to the Kingdom of Poland, and then the Teutonic Knights renounced any claims in the peace treaty of 1466. Człuchów was a county seat in the Pomeranian Voivodeship. The seat of local starosts was located in the castle. Many Jews immigrated to the town afterward, creating an enclosed Jewish quarter in the north of the town.

Encouraged by the Polish starosta Latal and the town's German-speaking populace, Człuchów converted to Lutheranism in 1550 during the Protestant Reformation. During the Counter-Reformation and encouraged by the Polish government, the town's main church was reclaimed by Catholics in 1609. By the end of the 16th century, Człuchów had 45 houses. In the mid-17th century starost Jakub Wejher renovated the castle and founded the Baroque Saint James church.

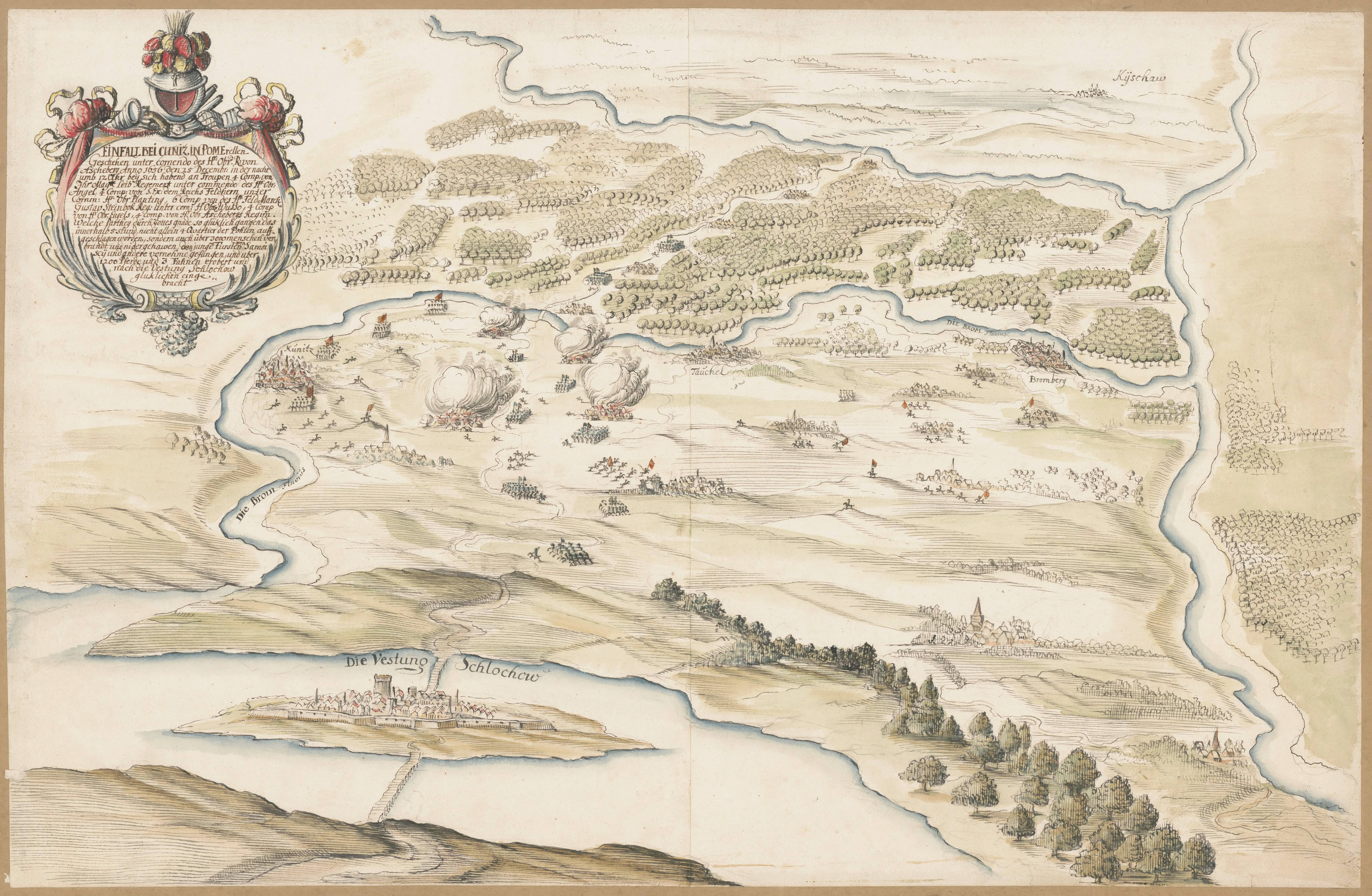
Perspective map of the battle at Człuchów, 1656

From 1655-57 during the Swedish invasion of Poland, known as the Deluge, the previously impregnable castle was captured by the Kingdom of Sweden and the town was heavily damaged.

In 1770 Człuchów had 135 houses. The town was annexed by the Kingdom of Prussia in the First Partition of Poland in 1772 and was referred to as "Schlochau", while fires in 1786 and 1793 destroyed numerous houses. King Frederick William II of Prussia allowed the usage of bricks from the castle during the rebuilding of the town, leaving the castle only with its keep. After the administrative reorganization of Prussia in 1818, Schlochau became the seat of Landkreis Schlochau in the Regierungsbezirk Marienwerder in the Province of West Prussia. Between 1826-28 the town's Protestant community built its chapel, which included the castle's keep as a church tower. The town began to grow economically after the completion through Schlochau of Reichsstraße 1, a roadway from Berlin to Königsberg. The town also received a boost to its development after the opening of a railway from Neustettin (Szczecinek) to Konitz (Chojnice) in 1878. Schlochau's main street was illuminated by 1844 and businesses began to be established near the easterly-located train station. The town's hospital was established by 1865 and the district's Sparkasse (savings bank) opened in 1871, the year Schlochau became part of the German Empire.

Resulting from the Treaty of Versailles in 1919 following World War I, Schlochau became part of the German border zone with the Second Polish Republic, whose began 10 km (6 mi) east of the town. This negatively impacted the town's trade and economy as it was cut off from much of its hinterland (East and West Prussia), although Schlochau's population grew through immigrants from Pomeranian lands restored to Poland. In the 1920s new outlying settlements began to develop from the influx of immigrants, and the town developed a sports center and a district museum. By 1937 Schlochau had a mill, a sawmill, and a population of 6,029 by 1939.

After 1922 the town belonged to the Province of Posen-West Prussia, but with that province's dissolution in 1938 Schlochau became part of Province of Pomerania. In that year the Nazis built a center for 600 members of the Hitler Youth. During World War II, the Polish resistance conducted espionage of German activity in the town. The German administration operated a forced labour subcamp of the Stalag II-B prisoner-of-war camp for over 300 Allied POWs. As the Eastern Front grew closer near the end of the war, the town's authorities began evacuating Schlochau. The Soviet Red Army reached the district's borders by the end of January 1945, but German resistance prevented them from capturing Schlochau until 17 February 1945, with the town 60% destroyed in the process. Its remaining German-speaking population was expelled to Germany after the war as the town became again part of Poland under its historic Polish name Człuchów.

From 1975 to 1998 it was administratively located in the Słupsk Voivodeship.

== Gmina and population ==
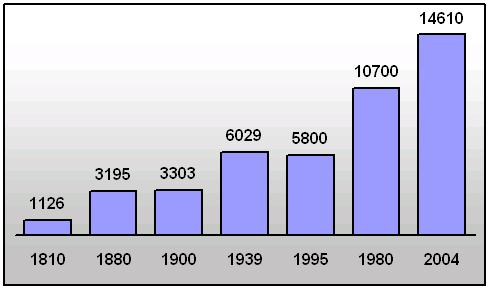
Historical population of Człuchów

The gmina Człuchów is 362 square kilometres (140 sq mi) and contains the following villages besides the town:

- Barkowo
- Biskupnica
- Brzeźno
- Bukowo
- Chrząstowo
- Czarnoszyce
- Człuchów
- Dębnica
- Ględowo
- Jaromierz
- Jęczniki Wielkie
- Kiełpin
- Krępsk
- Kłodowo
- Mosiny
- Polnica
- Rychnowy
- Stołczno
- Wierzchowo Dworzec
- Zagórki

== Notable people ==
- Ulrich von Jungingen (c.1360–1410) the 26th Grand Master of the Teutonic Knights, 1407-1410
- Friedrich Kasiski (1805–1881) a German infantry officer, cryptographer and archeologist
- Martin Grase (1891–1963) a German general during World War II
- Joachim Wandel (1914–1942) a Luftwaffe ace
- Karl Nitz (born 1932) a German judoka
- Archbishop Eugeniusz Popowicz (born 1961) a Polish Ukrainian Greek Catholic hierarch
- Ted Pietka (born 1967) a Polish businessman
- Ariel Jakubowski (born 1977) a Polish footballer, over 300 pro games
- Marcin Kobierski (born 1977) a Polish sprint canoer, competed in the 1996 Summer Olympics
- Marta Żmuda Trzebiatowska (born 1984) a Polish film, television and theater actress.
- Paweł Kaczmarek (born 1995) a Polish sprint kayaker, competed at the 2016 Summer Olympics

== International relations ==
Człuchów is twinned with:

Conches-en-Ouche, Eure, Normandy, France; Gdynia, Pomeranian Voivodeship, Poland	Kaniv, Cherkasy Oblast, Ukraine; Uslar, Lower Saxony, Germany

== See also ==
- Człuchów (PKP station)
