= Schlochau (district) =

Kreis Schlochau (Landkreis Schlochau as of 1939) was a Kreis, or district, of Prussia from 1818-1945. Its capital was Schlochau (Człuchów). By 1 January 1945, the district included five towns: Baldenburg (Biały Bór), Hammerstein (Czarne), Landeck (Lędyczek), Preußisch Friedland (Debrzno) and Schlochau (Człuchów). The district also included 72 communities and a forest region.

== History ==
Map of the districts of West Prussia.

The region was part of the medieval State of the Teutonic Order. After population decline in the wake of wars in the 15th century and partition of the Teutonic state to Polish part, German peasants from neighboring Farther Pomerania settled in the Schlochau region, which became German-speaking in majority. As the result of the Partitions of Poland, the region became part of Prussia.

The Schlochau district was created as a district within the Marienwerder Region on 1 April 1818, as a result of administrative reforms in the Kingdom of Prussia after the Napoleonic Wars. The Marienwerder Region formed part of West Prussia between 1815 and 1829 and again from 1878 to 1920, between the two periods the region, and thus Schlochau district, formed part of the Province of Prussia. The district encompassed most of the rural environs around Schlochau, where the district president had his office.

Following the dissolution of West Prussia after World War I and the Treaty of Versailles, the Schlochau district became part of Schneidemühl Region in the newly established Frontier strip of Posen-West Prussia province. The northeastern part of the district was transferred to the Second Polish Republic. When Posen-West Prussia was dissolved on 1 October 1938, the Schlochau district was transferred to Province of Pomerania and formed part of its new Frontier strip of Posen-West Prussia region, which was actually the Schneidemühl Region enlarged by four previously Brandenburgian and Pomeranian districts and renamed as Posen-West Prussia Region for reasons of tradition. On 1 January 1939, the district was renamed from Kreis Schlochau to Landkreis Schlochau, in the course of uniforming the administrative terminology in all the states of Germany.

The Schlochau district was conquered by the Soviet Red Army in 1945 during World War II. It was subsequently dissolved after being placed under Polish administration according to the post-war Potsdam Agreement.

== Demographics ==
The district had a majority German population, with a significant Kashubian minority.

Population by language in Kreis Schlochau
| | 1837 | | 1849 | | 1852 | | 1858 | |
|---|---|---|---|---|---|---|---|---|
| German | 32,101 | 88.4% | 39,917 | 87.3% | 42,021 | 86.8% | 45,515 | 86.3% |
| Kashubian | 4,226 | 11.6% | 5,784 | 12.7% | 6,392 | 13.2% | 7,201 | 13.7% |
| Total | 36,327 | | 45,701 | | 48,413 | | 52,716 | |

== Municipalities ==
At the end of its existence in 1945, the district of Schlochau comprised five towns and 71 other municipalities:

| Baldenburg, town; Bärenwalde; Barkenfelde; Bergelau; Bischofswalde; Bölzig; Breitenfelde; Briesnitz; Buchholz; Christfelde; Damerau; Damnitz; Darsen; Demmin; Deutsch Briesen; Dickhof; Domslaff; Eickfier; Eisenbrück | Eisenhammer; Elsenau; Falkenwalde; Fernheide; Firchau; Flötenstein; Förstenau; Geglenfelde; Grabau; Groß Jenznick; Groß Peterkau; Groß Wittfelde; Hammerstein, town; Hansfelde; Heinrichswalde; Klausfelde; Kramsk; Krummensee; Landeck in Westpreußen, town | Lanken; Lichtenhagen; Lissau; Loosen; Marienfelde; Mossin; Neuguth; Neuhof; Niesewanz; Pagdanzig; Pagelkau; Penkuhl; Peterswalde; Platzig; Pollnitz; Prechlau; Prechlauermühl; Preußisch Friedland, town; Prützenwalde | Richenwalde; Richnau; Rittersberg; Rosenfelde; Ruthenberg; Sampohl; Schlochau, town; Schönau; Schönberg; Semnitz; Starsen; Stegers; Steinborn; Steinforth; Stolzenfelde; Stremlau; Stretzin; Wehnershof; Woltersdorf |
