= Brzeźno, Człuchów County =

Brzeźno
- Village
- Location within Poland
- Coordinates: 53°39′57″N 17°28′43″E
- Country: Poland
- Voivodeship: Pomeranian
- County: Człuchów
- Gmina: Człuchów
- Population: 258
- Time zone: UTC+1 (CET)
  - Summer (DST): UTC+2 (CEST)
- Vehicle registration: GCZ

Brzeźno [ˈbʐɛʑnɔ] is a village in the administrative district of Gmina Człuchów, within Człuchów County, Pomeranian Voivodeship, in northern Poland. It is located within the ethnocultural region of Kashubia in the historic region of Pomerania.

== History ==
Brzeźno was a royal village of the Polish Crown, administratively located in the Człuchów County in the Pomeranian Voivodeship.

During the German occupation of Poland (World War II), several inhabitants of the village were among over 450 Poles massacred by the Germans in the Igielska Valley near Chojnice in October and November 1939 (see Intelligenzaktion).
