= Chrząstówko =

- Village
- Location within Poland
- Coordinates: 53°37′32″N 17°13′49″E
- Country: Poland
- Voivodeship: Pomeranian
- County: Człuchów
- Gmina: Człuchów
- Population: 79

Chrząstówko [xʂɔ̃sˈtufkɔ] is a village in the administrative district of Gmina Człuchów, within Człuchów County, Pomeranian Voivodeship, in northern Poland approximately 10 km (6 mi) west of Człuchów and 124 km (77 mi) south-west of the regional capital Gdańsk.
