= Wierzchowo, Pomeranian Voivodeship =

Wierzchowo
- Village
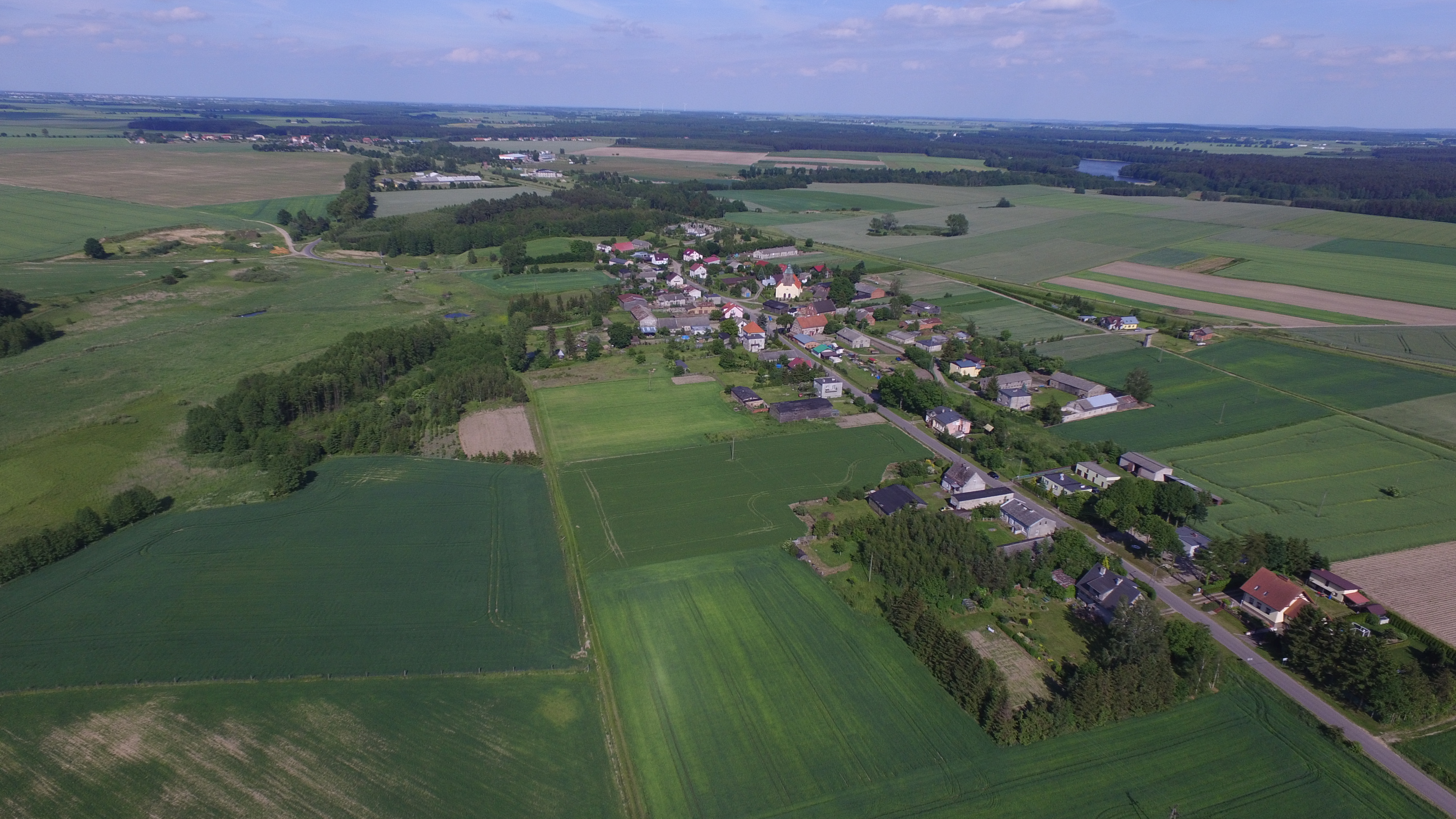
- Aerial view of Wierzchowo

- Location within Poland
- Coordinates: 53°36′21″N 17°25′14″E
- Country: Poland
- Voivodeship: Pomeranian
- County: Człuchów
- Gmina: Człuchów
- Population: 331
- Time zone: UTC+1 (CET)
  - Summer (DST): UTC+2 (CEST)
- Vehicle registration: GCZ

Wierzchowo [vjɛʂˈxɔvɔ] (German: Firchau) is a village in the administrative district of Gmina Człuchów, within Człuchów County, Pomeranian Voivodeship, in northern Poland. It is located within the historic region of Pomerania.

== History ==
Wierzchowo was a royal village of the Polish Crown, administratively located in the Człuchów County in the Pomeranian Voivodeship. With the First Partition of Poland in 1772, the village, as Firchau became part of the Schlochau district in the Prussian province of West Prussia. In 1871, it became part of Germany, where it remained until 1945. From 1922 to 1938, it was part of the Province of Posen-West Prussia and from 1938 to 1945, it was part of the Province of Pomerania.

From 1920 to 1939, Firchau was located on the border between Germany and Poland and had a railway station of the Prussian Eastern Railway, which was the last station in Germany before the Polish border. The next station, Moszczenica Pomorska (Mosnitz) was on the Polish side. Since 1945, the village has belonged to Poland.
