= Nowosiółki, Pomeranian Voivodeship =

Nowosiółki
- Village
- Location within Poland
- Coordinates: 53°41′22″N 17°18′42″E
- Country: Poland
- Voivodeship: Pomeranian
- County: Człuchów
- Gmina: Człuchów
- Population: 54

Nowosiółki [nɔvɔˈɕuu̯ki] is a village in the administrative district of Gmina Człuchów, in Człuchów County, Pomeranian Voivodeship, in northern Poland approximately 6 km (4 mi) north-west of Człuchów and 115 km (71 mi) south-west of the regional capital Gdańsk.
