= Dobojewo, Człuchów County =

Dobojewo
- Village
- Location within Poland
- Coordinates: 53°41′50″N 17°15′42″E
- Country: Poland
- Voivodeship: Pomeranian
- County: Człuchów
- Gmina: Człuchów
- Population: 209

Dobojewo [dɔbɔˈjɛvɔ] is a village in the administrative district of Gmina Człuchów, in Człuchów County, Pomeranian Voivodeship, in northern Poland approximately 9 km (6 mi) north-west of Człuchów and 117 km (73 mi) south-west of the regional capital Gdańsk.
