= Grzybowo, Gmina Człuchów =

Grzybowo
- Settlement
- Location within Poland
- Coordinates: 53°44′45″N 17°24′48″E
- Country: Poland
- Voivodeship: Pomeranian
- County: Człuchów
- Gmina: Człuchów
- Population: 59

Grzybowo [ɡʐɨˈbɔvɔ] is a settlement in the administrative district of Gmina Człuchów, within Człuchów County, Pomeranian Voivodeship, in northern Poland.

For details of the history of the region, see History of Pomerania.
