= Wiczlino, Gdynia =

Wiczlino
- Estate
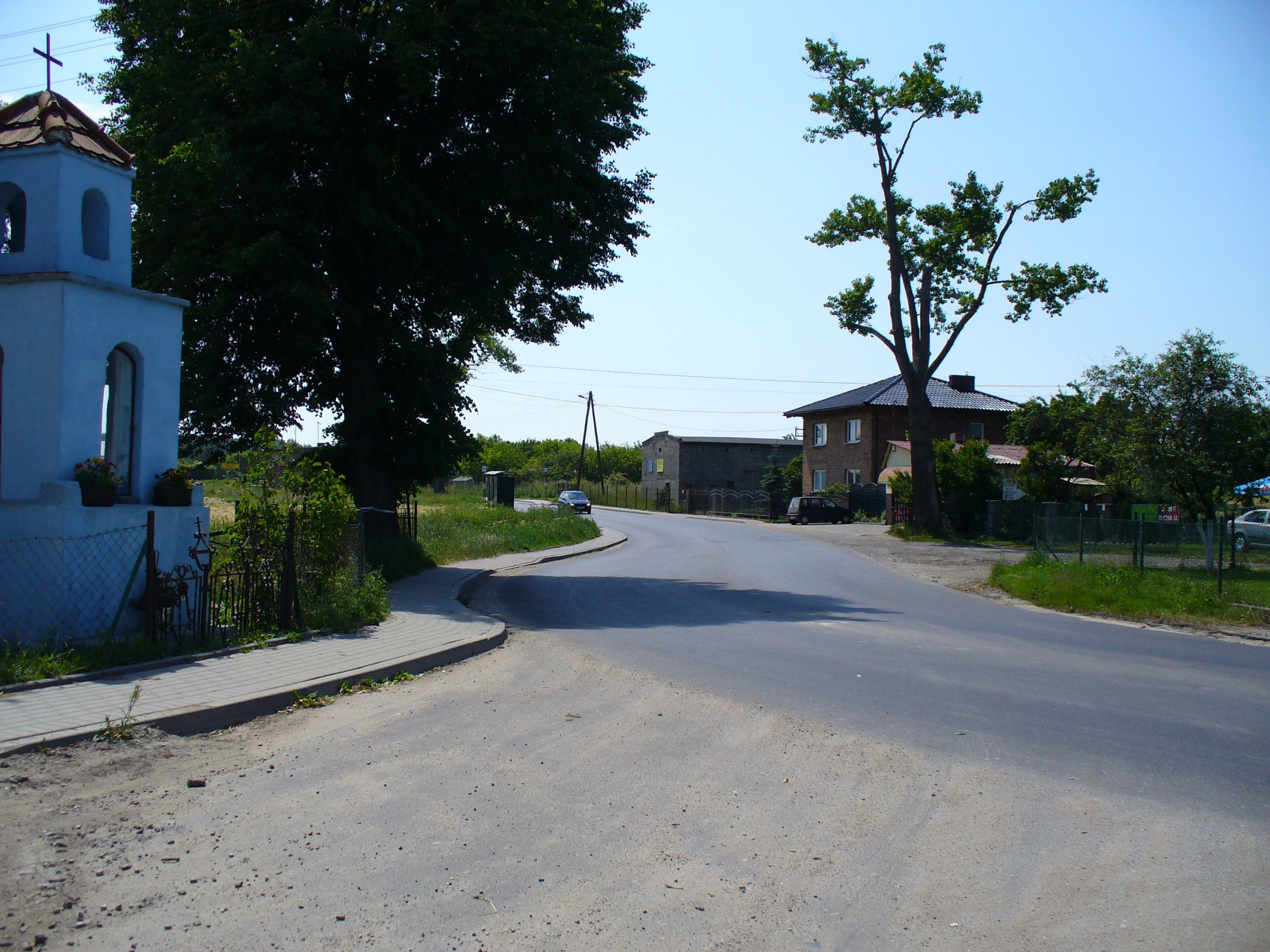
- Country: Poland
- Voivodeship: Pomeranian Voivodeship
- County/City: Gdynia
- Time zone: UTC+1 (CET)
  - Summer (DST): UTC+2 (CEST)

Wiczlino (Kashubian: Wiczlëno, German: Vitzlin) is a housing estate in Gdynia, Poland. It is in the Chwarzno-Wiczlino district. In 1973 Wiczlino and the surrounding area was attached to Gdynia. At the beginning of the twenty-first century it was made up of single family houses, surrounded by meadows, fields and woodland. Since twenty years many modern estates were constructed.

The name Wiczlino refers to the area around the old village or the whole Chwarzno-Wiczlino district.

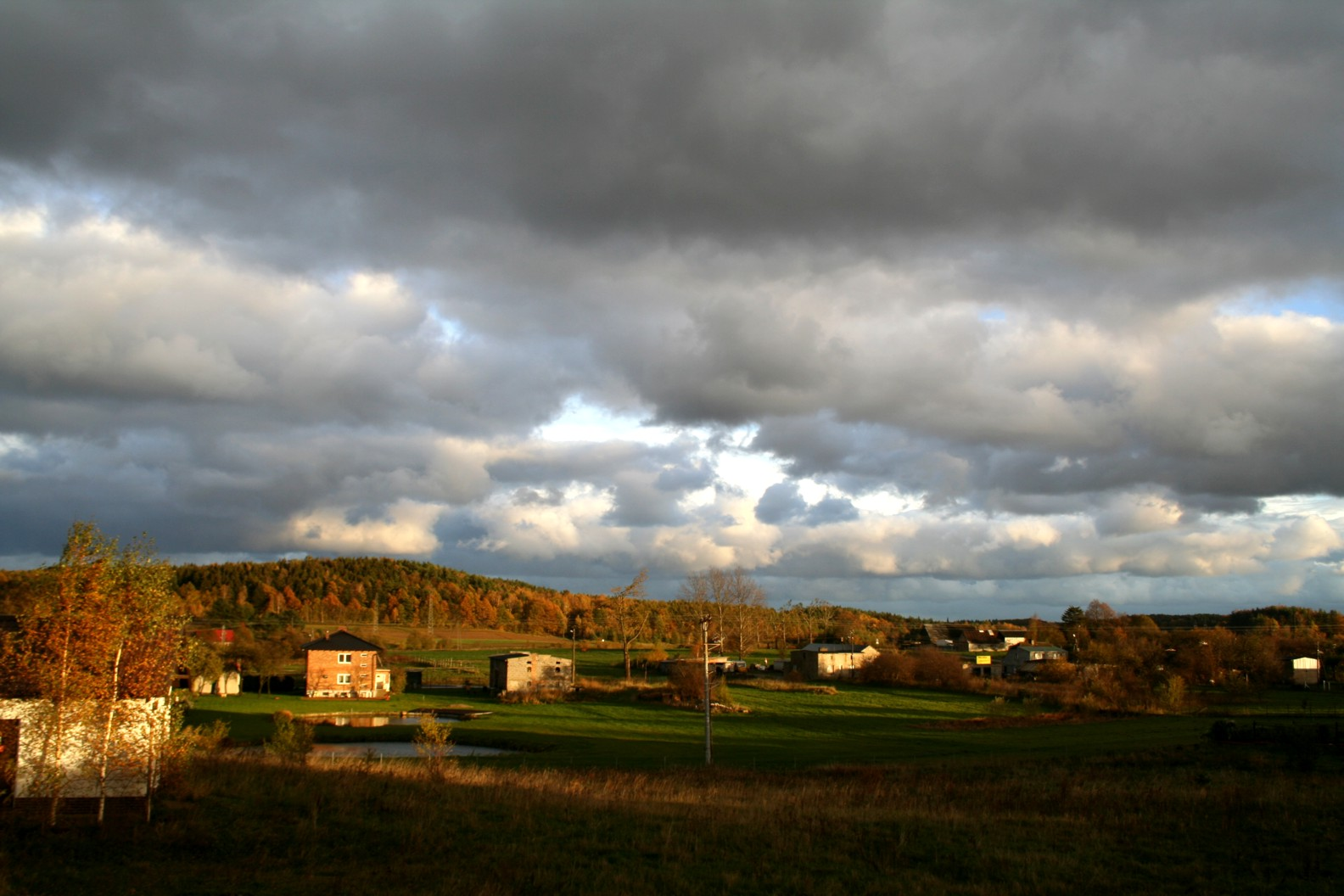
Wiczlino

== History ==
The name Wiczlino (Wizlin) first appeared in written sources in 1342. The first inhabitant of Wiczlino known by name is Paszken von Witzlynn in the 15th century. He was detained by Gdańsk authorities for an unknown reason. It was a private village, administratively located in the Gdańsk County in the Pomeranian Voivodeship of the Kingdom of Poland. Following the Partitions of Poland the village had many owners and lands were often sold. In 1911 the Wiczlinian OSP (volunteer fire department) were established.During the German occupation in World War II both schools were destroyed, the first in September 1939, the other in 1945 during heavy fighting. In 1973 Wiczlino and surrounding area was attached to the city of Gdynia. The Kashubian roots of the area are disappearing.

== Geography ==
Kacza river flows through Wiczlino, appearing near the Gdynia boarder in Szemud Gmina from a small local wetland. Its left tributary is Potok Wiczliński, which starts its course in the western part of Wiczlino.
