= Krępsk =

- Village
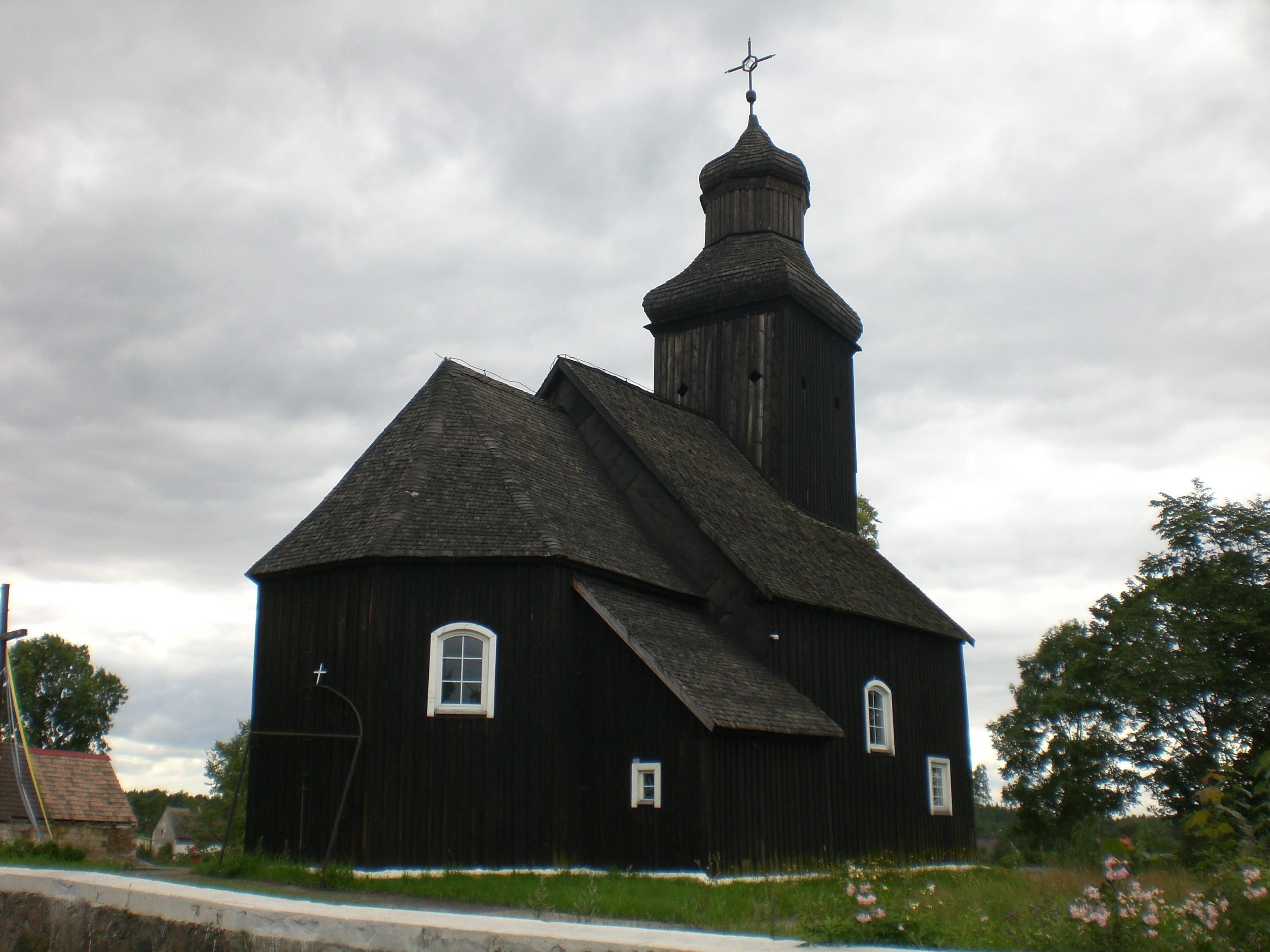
- Saint James church in Krępsk

- Location within Poland
- Coordinates: 53°42′10″N 17°13′32″E
- Country: Poland
- Voivodeship: Pomeranian
- County: Człuchów
- Gmina: Człuchów
- Population: 192
- Time zone: UTC+1 (CET)
  - Summer (DST): UTC+2 (CEST)
- Vehicle registration: GCZ

Krępsk [krɛmpsk] is a village in the administrative district of Gmina Człuchów, within Człuchów County, Pomeranian Voivodeship, in northern Poland. It is located within the historic region of Pomerania.

Krępsk was a royal village of the Polish Crown, administratively located in the Człuchów County in the Pomeranian Voivodeship.
