= Czarze =

- Settlement
- Location within Poland
- Coordinates: 53°44′54″N 17°26′01″E
- Country: Poland
- Voivodeship: Pomeranian
- County: Człuchów
- Gmina: Człuchów
- Population: 5

Czarze [ˈt͡ʂaʐɛ] is a settlement in the administrative district of Gmina Człuchów, within Człuchów County, Pomeranian Voivodeship, in northern Poland.

For details of the history of the region, see History of Pomerania.
