= Zbrzyca, Człuchów County =

Zbrzyca
- Settlement
- Location within Poland
- Coordinates: 53°41′11″N 17°19′08″E
- Country: Poland
- Voivodeship: Pomeranian
- County: Człuchów
- Gmina: Człuchów

Zbrzyca [ˈzbʐɨt͡sa] is a settlement in the administrative district of Gmina Człuchów, within Człuchów County, Pomeranian Voivodeship, in northern Poland.
