= Gmina Człuchów =

Gmina Człuchów Człuchów Commune
- Gmina
- Flag Coat of arms
- Interactive map of Gmina Człuchów
- Coordinates (Człuchów): 53°39′N 17°22′E
- Country: Poland
- Voivodeship: Pomeranian
- County: Człuchów
- Seat: Człuchów

Area
  - Total: 361.65 km^{2} (139.63 sq mi)

Population (2006)
  - Total: 10,180
  - Density: 28.15/km^{2} (72.90/sq mi)
- Website: http://www.ugczluchow.pl/

Gmina Człuchów is a rural gmina (administrative district) in Człuchów County, Pomeranian Voivodeship, in northern Poland. Its seat is the town of Człuchów, although the town is not part of the territory of the gmina.

The gmina covers an area of 361.65 square kilometres (139.6 sq mi), and as of 2006 its total population is 10,180.

== Villages ==
Gmina Człuchów contains the villages and settlements of Barkowo, Biskupnica, Brzeźno, Bukowo, Bukowo Człuchowskie, Chrząstówko, Chrząstowo, Czarnoszki, Czarnoszyce, Czarze, Dąbki, Dębnica, Dobojewo, Dziewiątka, Gębarzewo, Ględowo, Gostudź, Gozdnica, Grzybowo, Jaromierz, Jęczniki Małe, Jęczniki Wielkie, Jeziorno, Kątki, Kiełpin, Kiełpinek, Kołdowo, Krępsk, Krery, Krzyżanki, Kujanki, Mąkowo, Mirogniew, Mosiny, Murzynowo, Nieżywięć, Nowosiółki, Piaskowo, Płonica, Polnica, Polniczka, Przytok, Rogowo, Rychnowy, Sieroczyn, Skarszewo, Skórzewo, Śniaty, Sokole, Stara Rogoźnica, Stołczno, Wierzchowo, Wierzchowo-Dworzec, Zagórki, Zbrzyca and Zielątkowo.

== Neighbouring gminas ==
Gmina Człuchów is bordered by the town of Człuchów and by the gminas of Chojnice, Czarne, Debrzno, Kamień Krajeński, Konarzyny, Przechlewo and Rzeczenica.
