= Skarszewo =

Skarszewo may refer to the following places:

- Skarszewo, Kuyavian-Pomeranian Voivodeship (north-central Poland)
- Skarszewo, Człuchów County in Pomeranian Voivodeship (north Poland)
- Skarszewo, Lębork County in Pomeranian Voivodeship (north Poland)
- Skarszewo, Warmian-Masurian Voivodeship (north Poland)
