= Przytok, Pomeranian Voivodeship =

Przytok
- Settlement
- Location within Poland
- Coordinates: 53°37′33″N 17°20′29″E
- Country: Poland
- Voivodeship: Pomeranian
- County: Człuchów
- Gmina: Człuchów
- Population: 32

Przytok [ˈpʂɨtɔk] is a settlement in the administrative district of Gmina Człuchów, within Człuchów County, Pomeranian Voivodeship, in northern Poland.

For details of the history of the region, see History of Pomerania.
