= Dziewiątka, Pomeranian Voivodeship =

Dziewiątka
- Village
- Location within Poland
- Coordinates: 53°36′12″N 17°17′50″E
- Country: Poland
- Voivodeship: Pomeranian
- County: Człuchów
- Gmina: Człuchów

Dziewiątka [d͡ʑɛˈvjɔntka] is a village in the administrative district of Gmina Człuchów, within Człuchów County, Pomeranian Voivodeship, in northern Poland.

For details of the history of the region, see History of Pomerania.
