= Kiełpinek, Człuchów County =

Kiełpinek
- Village
- Location within Poland
- Coordinates: 53°43′11″N 17°21′54″E
- Country: Poland
- Voivodeship: Pomeranian
- County: Człuchów
- Gmina: Człuchów
- Population: 191

Kiełpinek [kʲɛu̯ˈpinɛk] is a village in the administrative district of Gmina Człuchów, within Człuchów County, Pomeranian Voivodeship, in northern Poland.
