= Krzyżanki, Człuchów County =

Krzyżanki
- Village
- Location within Poland
- Coordinates: 53°41′31″N 17°25′31″E
- Country: Poland
- Voivodeship: Pomeranian
- County: Człuchów
- Gmina: Człuchów
- Population: 144

Krzyżanki [kʂɨˈʐanki] is a village in the administrative district of Gmina Człuchów, in Człuchów County, Pomeranian Voivodeship, in northern Poland approximately 7 km (4 mi) northeast of Człuchów and 109 km (68 mi) southwest of the regional capital Gdańsk.

For details of the history of the region, see History of Pomerania.
