= Wierzchowo-Dworzec =

- Village
- Location within Poland
- Coordinates: 53°36′42″N 17°26′20″E
- Country: Poland
- Voivodeship: Pomeranian
- County: Człuchów
- Gmina: Człuchów
- Population: 654

Wierzchowo-Dworzec [vjɛʂˈxɔvɔ ˈdvɔʐɛt͡s] is a village in the administrative district of Gmina Człuchów, within Człuchów County, Pomeranian Voivodeship, in northern Poland.

For details of the history of the region, see History of Pomerania.
