= Sieroczyn =

- Village
- Location within Poland
- Coordinates: 53°40′2″N 17°18′23″E
- Country: Poland
- Voivodeship: Pomeranian
- County: Człuchów
- Gmina: Człuchów
- Population: 193

Sieroczyn [ɕɛˈrɔt͡ʂɨn] is a village in the administrative district of Gmina Człuchów, within Człuchów County, Pomeranian Voivodeship, Poland.

For details of the history of the region, see History of Pomerania.
