= Zielątkowo =

Zielątkowo may refer to the following places:

- Zielątkowo, Greater Poland Voivodeship (west-central Poland)
- Zielątkowo, Lubusz Voivodeship (west Poland)
- Zielątkowo, Człuchów County in Pomeranian Voivodeship (north Poland)
