= Kątki =

Kątki may refer to the following places in Poland:

- Kątki, Lower Silesian Voivodeship (south-west Poland)
- Kątki, Masovian Voivodeship (east-central Poland)
- Kątki, Pomeranian Voivodeship (north Poland)
- Kątki, Człuchów County in Pomeranian Voivodeship
