= Gębarzewo, Pomeranian Voivodeship =

Gębarzewo
- Village
- Location within Poland
- Coordinates: 53°39′8″N 17°11′51″E
- Country: Poland
- Voivodeship: Pomeranian
- County: Człuchów
- Gmina: Człuchów
- Population: 183

Gębarzewo [ɡɛmbaˈʐɛvɔ] is a village in the administrative district of Gmina Człuchów, within Człuchów County, Pomeranian Voivodeship, in northern Poland.

For details of the history of the region, see History of Pomerania.
