= Polnica, Człuchów County =

Polnica
- Village
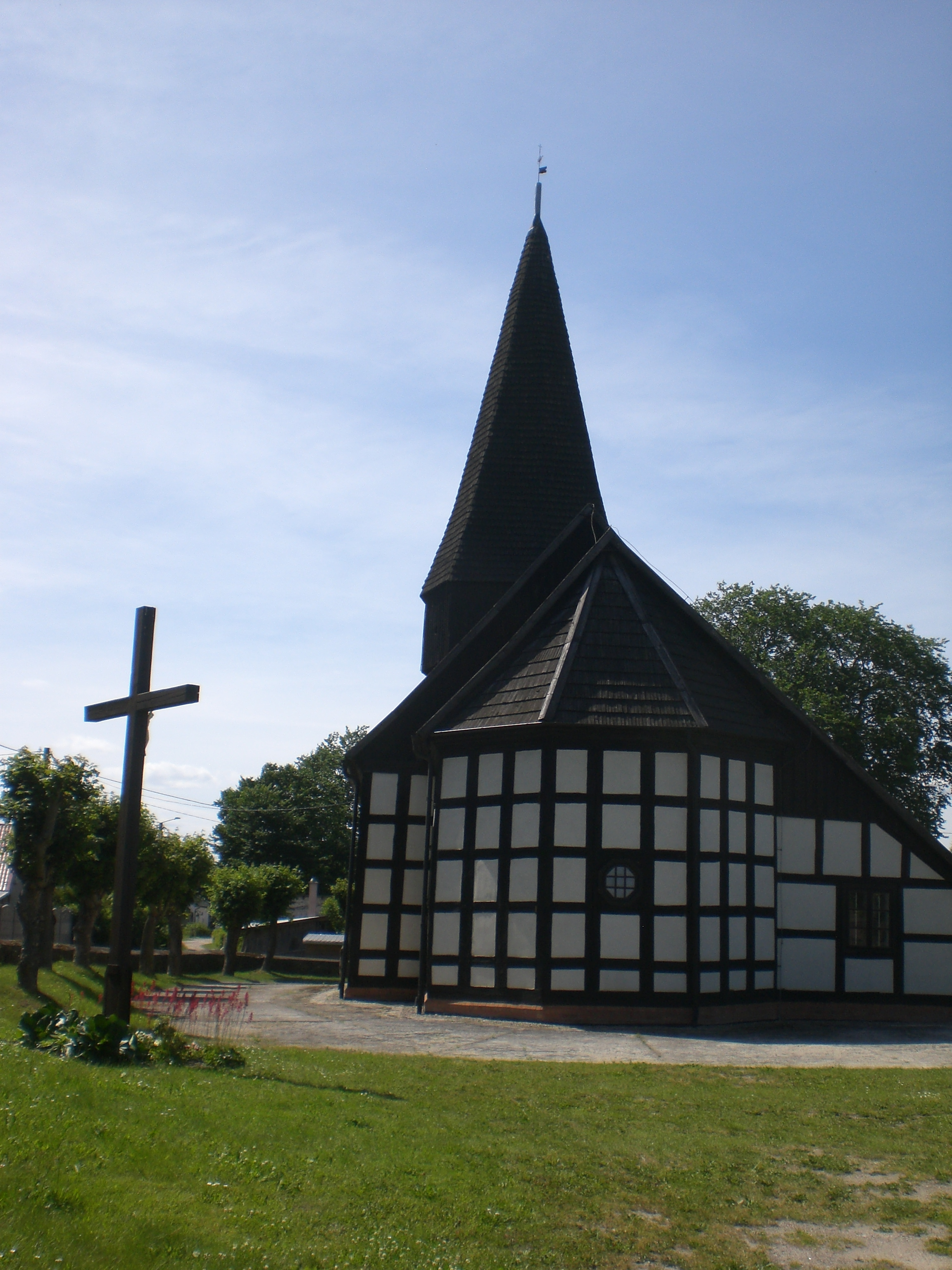
- Polnica, Holy Trinity Parish Church

- Location within Poland
- Coordinates: 53°45′3″N 17°24′3″E
- Country: Poland
- Voivodeship: Pomeranian
- County: Człuchów
- Gmina: Człuchów
- Population: 881
- Time zone: UTC+1 (CET)
  - Summer (DST): UTC+2 (CEST)
- Vehicle registration: GCZ

Polnica [pɔlˈnit͡sa] is a village in the administrative district of Gmina Człuchów, within Człuchów County, Pomeranian Voivodeship, in northern Poland. It is located within the ethnocultural region of Kashubia in the historic region of Pomerania.

Polnica was a royal village of the Polish Crown, administratively located in the Człuchów County in the Pomeranian Voivodeship.
