= Polniczka, Pomeranian Voivodeship =

Polniczka
- Village
- Location within Poland
- Coordinates: 53°45′30″N 17°22′59″E
- Country: Poland
- Voivodeship: Pomeranian
- County: Człuchów
- Gmina: Człuchów
- Population: 158

Polniczka [pɔlˈnit͡ʂka] is a village in the administrative district of Gmina Człuchów, within Człuchów County, Pomeranian Voivodeship, in northern Poland.

For details of the history of the region, see History of Pomerania.
