= Krzyżanki =

Krzyżanki may refer to the following places:

- Krzyżanki, Gostyń County in Greater Poland Voivodeship (west-central Poland)
- Krzyżanki, Wągrowiec County in Greater Poland Voivodeship (west-central Poland)
- Krzyżanki, Człuchów County in Pomeranian Voivodeship (north Poland)
- Krzyżanki, Sztum County in Pomeranian Voivodeship (north Poland)
