= Rychnowy, Pomeranian Voivodeship =

Rychnowy
- Village
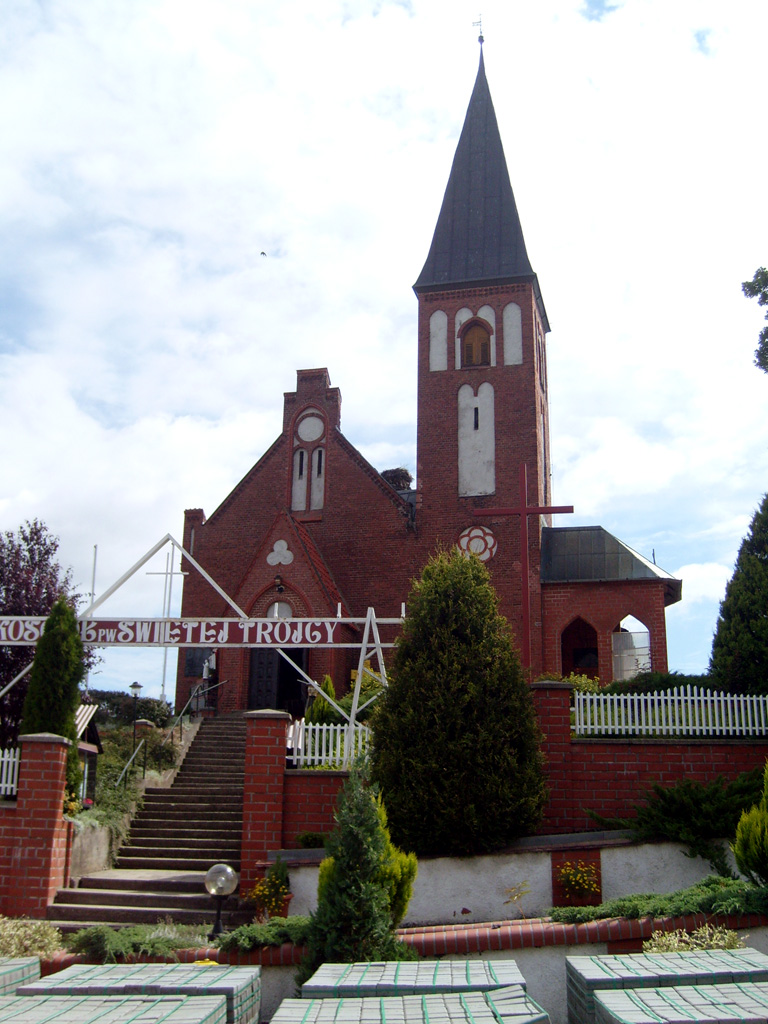
- Holy Trinity church in Rychnowy

- Location within Poland
- Coordinates: 53°40′58″N 17°25′43″E
- Country: Poland
- Voivodeship: Pomeranian
- County: Człuchów
- Gmina: Człuchów
- Population: 611
- Time zone: UTC+1 (CET)
  - Summer (DST): UTC+2 (CEST)
- Vehicle registration: GCZ
- Website: www.rychnowy.prv.pl

Rychnowy [rɨxˈnɔvɨ] is a village in the administrative district of Gmina Człuchów, within Człuchów County, Pomeranian Voivodeship, in northern Poland. It is located within the historic region of Pomerania.

Rychnowy was a royal village of the Polish Crown, administratively located in the Człuchów County in the Pomeranian Voivodeship.
