= Mirogniew, Pomeranian Voivodeship =

Mirogniew
- Settlement
- Location within Poland
- Coordinates: 53°35′1″N 17°24′25″E
- Country: Poland
- Voivodeship: Pomeranian
- County: Człuchów
- Gmina: Człuchów
- Population: 58

Mirogniew [miˈrɔɡɲɛf] is a settlement in the administrative district of Gmina Człuchów, within Człuchów County, Pomeranian Voivodeship, in northern Poland.

For details of the history of the region, see History of Pomerania.
