= Stara Rogoźnica =

- Settlement
- Location within Poland
- Coordinates: 53°46′1″N 17°25′44″E
- Country: Poland
- Voivodeship: Pomeranian
- County: Człuchów
- Gmina: Człuchów
- Population: 5

Stara Rogoźnica [ˈstara rɔɡɔʑˈnit͡sa] is a settlement in the administrative district of Gmina Człuchów, within Człuchów County, Pomeranian Voivodeship, in northern Poland.

For details of the history of the region, see History of Pomerania.
