= Zielątkowo, Człuchów County =

Zielątkowo
- Settlement
- Location within Poland
- Coordinates: 53°43′24″N 17°24′55″E
- Country: Poland
- Voivodeship: Pomeranian
- County: Człuchów
- Gmina: Człuchów
- Population: 3

Zielątkowo [ʑɛlɔntˈkɔvɔ] is a settlement in the administrative district of Gmina Człuchów, in Człuchów County, Pomeranian Voivodeship, in northern Poland approximately 9 km (6 mi) north of Człuchów and 107 km (66 mi) south-west of the regional capital Gdańsk.
