= Sokole, Człuchów County =

Sokole
- Settlement
- Location within Poland
- Coordinates: 53°44′31″N 17°21′43″E
- Country: Poland
- Voivodeship: Pomeranian
- County: Człuchów
- Gmina: Człuchów
- Population: 121

Sokole [sɔˈkɔlɛ] is a settlement in the administrative district of Gmina Człuchów, within Człuchów County, Pomeranian Voivodeship, in northern Poland.

For details of the history of the region, see History of Pomerania.
