= Jeziorno =

Jeziorno may refer to the following places:

- Jeziorno, Greater Poland Voivodeship (west-central Poland)
- Jeziorno, Kuyavian-Pomeranian Voivodeship (north-central Poland)
- Jeziorno, Masovian Voivodeship (east-central Poland)
- Jeziorno, Pomeranian Voivodeship (north Poland)
- Jeziorno, Człuchów County in Pomeranian Voivodeship (north Poland)
- Jeziorno, Warmian-Masurian Voivodeship (north Poland)
