= Mąkowo =

- Settlement
- Location within Poland
- Coordinates: 53°37′15″N 17°24′17″E
- Country: Poland
- Voivodeship: Pomeranian
- County: Człuchów
- Gmina: Człuchów
- Population: 19

Mąkowo [mɔnˈkɔvɔ] is a settlement in the administrative district of Gmina Człuchów, within Człuchów County, Pomeranian Voivodeship, in northern Poland.

For details of the history of the region, see History of Pomerania.
