= Rogowo, Pomeranian Voivodeship =

Rogowo
- Settlement
- Location within Poland
- Coordinates: 53°37′24″N 17°08′10″E
- Country: Poland
- Voivodeship: Pomeranian
- County: Człuchów
- Gmina: Człuchów
- Population: 11

Rogowo [rɔˈɡɔvɔ] is a settlement in the administrative district of Gmina Człuchów, within Człuchów County, Pomeranian Voivodeship, in northern Poland.

For details of the history of the region, see History of Pomerania.
