= Jaromierz, Człuchów County =

Jaromierz
- Village
- Location within Poland
- Coordinates: 53°38′17″N 17°17′10″E
- Country: Poland
- Voivodeship: Pomeranian
- County: Człuchów
- Gmina: Człuchów
- Population: 188

Jaromierz [jaˈrɔmjɛʂ] is a village in the administrative district of Gmina Człuchów, within Człuchów County, Pomeranian Voivodeship, in northern Poland.

For details of the history of the region, see History of Pomerania.
