= Ględowo =

- Village
- Location within Poland
- Coordinates: 53°39′28″N 17°24′15″E
- Country: Poland
- Voivodeship: Pomeranian
- County: Człuchów
- Gmina: Człuchów
- Population: 667
- Time zone: UTC+1 (CET)
  - Summer (DST): UTC+2 (CEST)
- Vehicle registration: GCZ

Ględowo [ɡlɛnˈdɔvɔ] (German: Lichtenhagen) is a village in the administrative district of Gmina Człuchów, within Człuchów County, Pomeranian Voivodeship, in northern Poland. It is located within the historic region of Pomerania.

Ględowo was a royal village of the Polish Crown, administratively located in the Człuchów County in the Pomeranian Voivodeship.
