= Bukowo, Człuchów County =

Bukowo
- Village
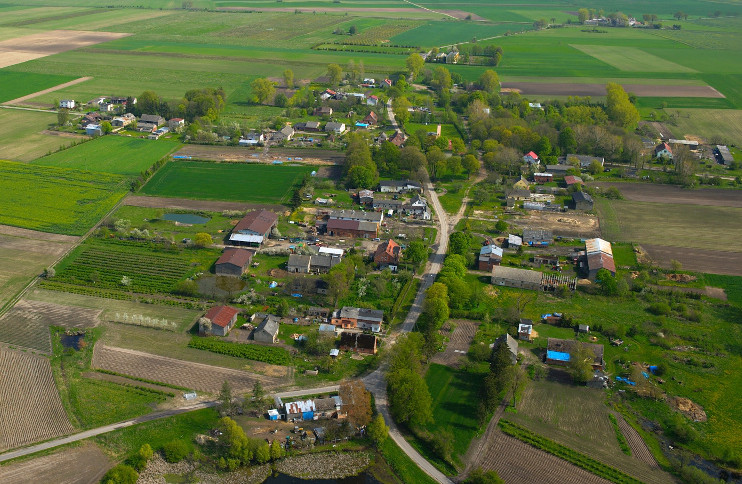
- Aerial view

- Location within Poland
- Coordinates: 53°35′29″N 17°22′55″E
- Country: Poland
- Voivodeship: Pomeranian
- County: Człuchów
- Gmina: Człuchów
- Population: 209

Bukowo [buˈkɔvɔ] is a village in the administrative district of Gmina Człuchów, within Człuchów County, Pomeranian Voivodeship, in northern Poland.

For details of the history of the region, see History of Pomerania.
