= Ted Pietka =

Ted Pietka (born May 30, 1967 in Człuchów, Poland) is a businessman. He graduated from Wilfrid Laurier University, Waterloo, Ontario, Canada and holds Master of Business Administration degree from London Business School, United Kingdom. Pietka is a Supervisory Board Member in Boryszew S.A. (company listed on Warsaw Stock Exchange), Boryszew ERG S.A. and Hygienika S.A. From 2007 to 2009 he served as the Managing Director, Strategy & Finance and a Board Member of STC Investments. From 2004 to 2006, Pietka was the Vice Chairman of the Management Board of GETIN Holding S.A. (company listed on Warsaw Stock Exchange).

He serves as the Managing Director of WinVentures, a Venture Capital Investment Fund with investments in healthcare, financial services, transportation sectors and TMT.
