= Lędyczek =

- Village
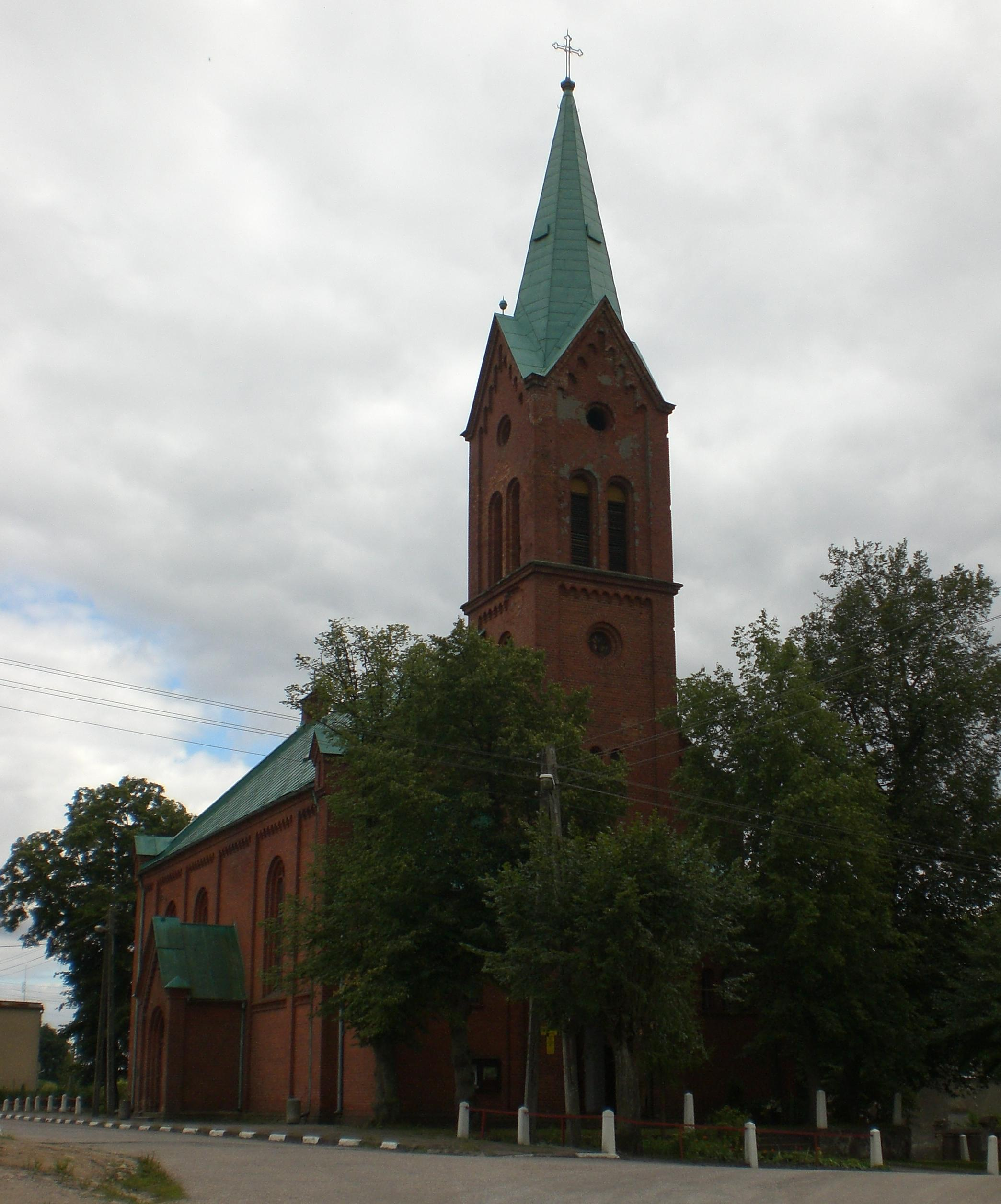
- Saints Peter and Paul church in Lędyczek

- Location within Poland
- Coordinates: 53°32′N 16°57′E
- Country: Poland
- Voivodeship: Greater Poland
- County: Złotów
- Gmina: Okonek
- Population: 526
- Time zone: UTC+1 (CET)
  - Summer (DST): UTC+2 (CEST)
- Vehicle registration: PZL
- Website: http://ledyczek.free.ngo.pl

Lędyczek [lɛnˈdɨt͡ʂɛk] (German: Landeck in Westpreußen) is a village in the administrative district of Gmina Okonek, within Złotów County, Greater Poland Voivodeship, in northwestern Poland.

Lędyczek was a royal village of the Polish Crown, administratively located in the Człuchów County in the Pomeranian Voivodeship.
