= Czarnoszyce =

- Village
- Location within Poland
- Coordinates: 53°44′41″N 17°26′38″E
- Country: Poland
- Voivodeship: Pomeranian
- County: Człuchów
- Gmina: Człuchów
- Area: 1.9 km^{2} (0.73 sq mi)
- Population: 97

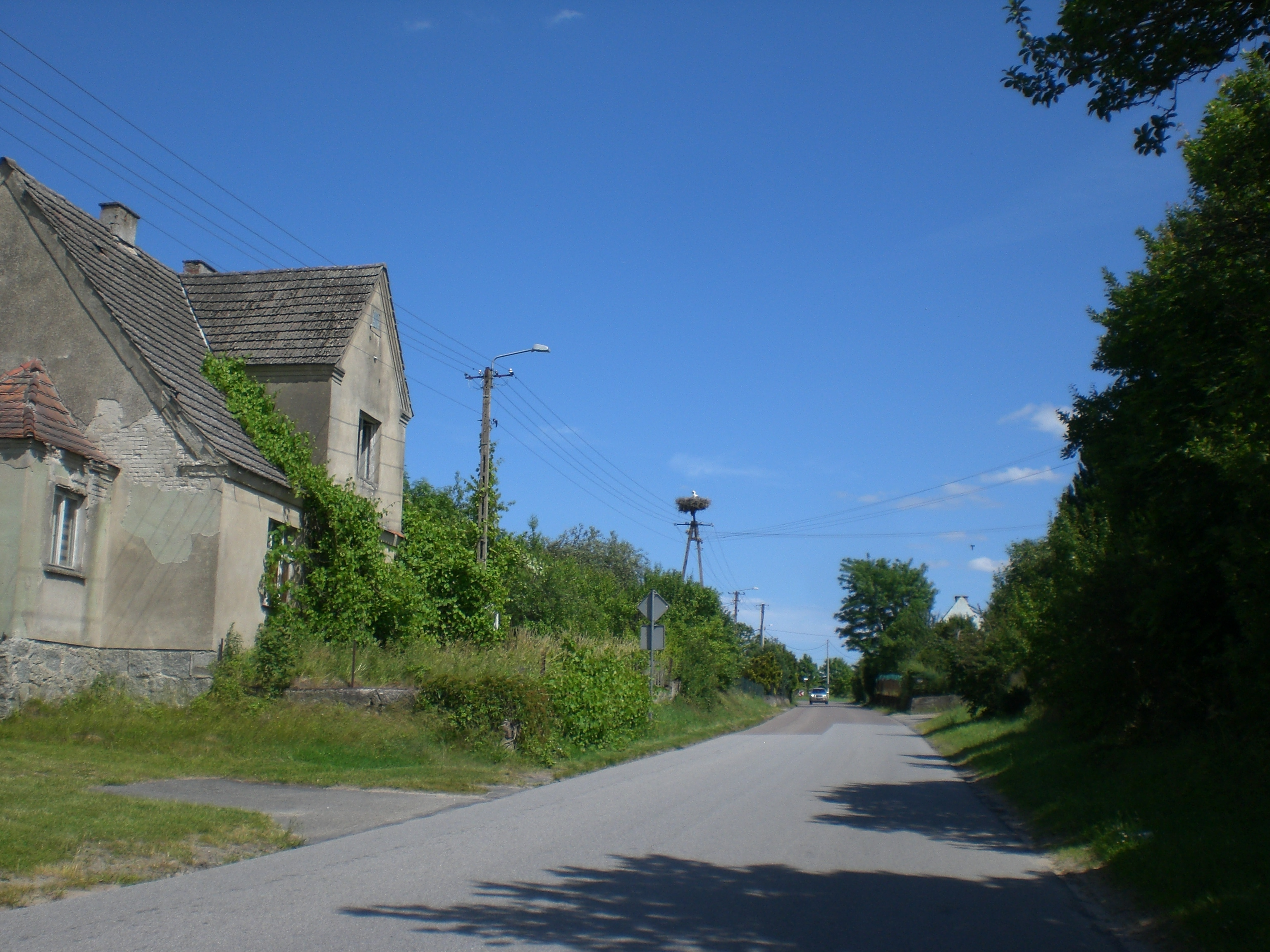
Czarnoszyce, bocianie gniazdo

Czarnoszyce [t͡ʂarnɔˈʂɨt͡sɛ] is a village in the administrative district of Gmina Człuchów, within Człuchów County, Pomeranian Voivodeship, in northern Poland.

Czarnoszyce is one of the 25 sołectwa (village administrative units) of Gmina Człuchów.

The village cadastral area covers approximately 1.9 km².

Nearby settlements include Czarnoszki, Czarze, and Jeziorno within Gmina Człuchów, as well as Łukomie approximately 2.5 km to the east and Stara Rogoźnica approximately 2.5 km to the north-west.

For details of the history of the region, see History of Pomerania.
