= Debrzno =

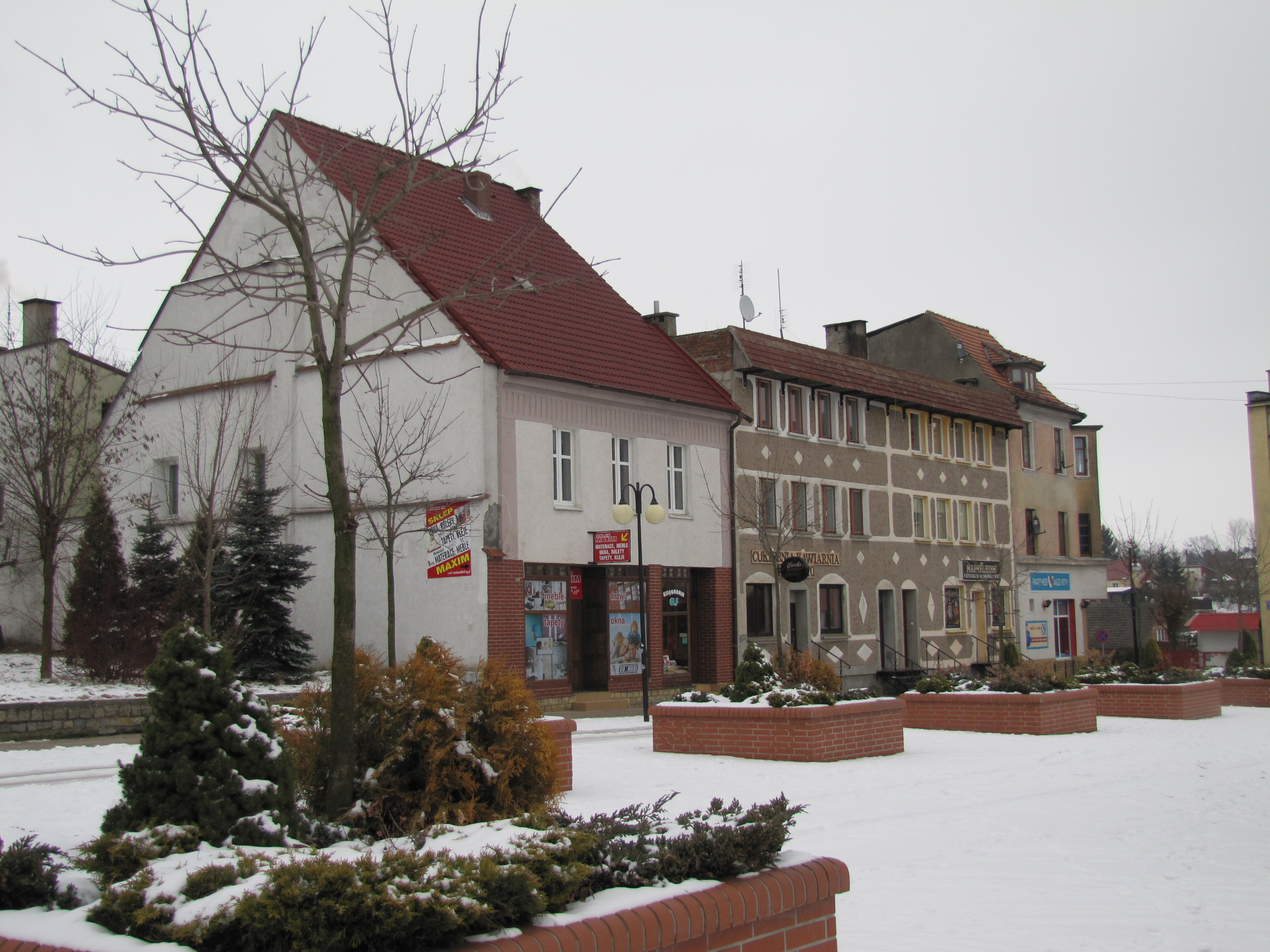
- Fragment of the town square

- Flag Coat of arms

- Location within Poland
- Coordinates: 53°32′N 17°14′E
- Country: Poland
- Voivodeship: Pomeranian
- County: Człuchów
- Gmina: Debrzno
- First mentioned: 12th century
- Town rights: 1354

Government
  - Mayor: Wojciech Kallas

Area
  - Total: 7.52 km^{2} (2.90 sq mi)

Population (31 December 2021)
  - Total: 4,983
  - Density: 663/km^{2} (1,720/sq mi)
- Postal code: 77-310
- Area code: +48 59
- Car plates: GCZ
- Website: http://www.debrzno.pl

Debrzno [ˈdɛbʐnɔ] (historically: Frydląd Pomorski; Kashubian: Frédląd, Fréląd, or Frëdląd; German: Preußisch Friedland) is a town in Pomeranian Voivodeship, Poland. As of December 2021, the town has a population of 4,983.

== History ==
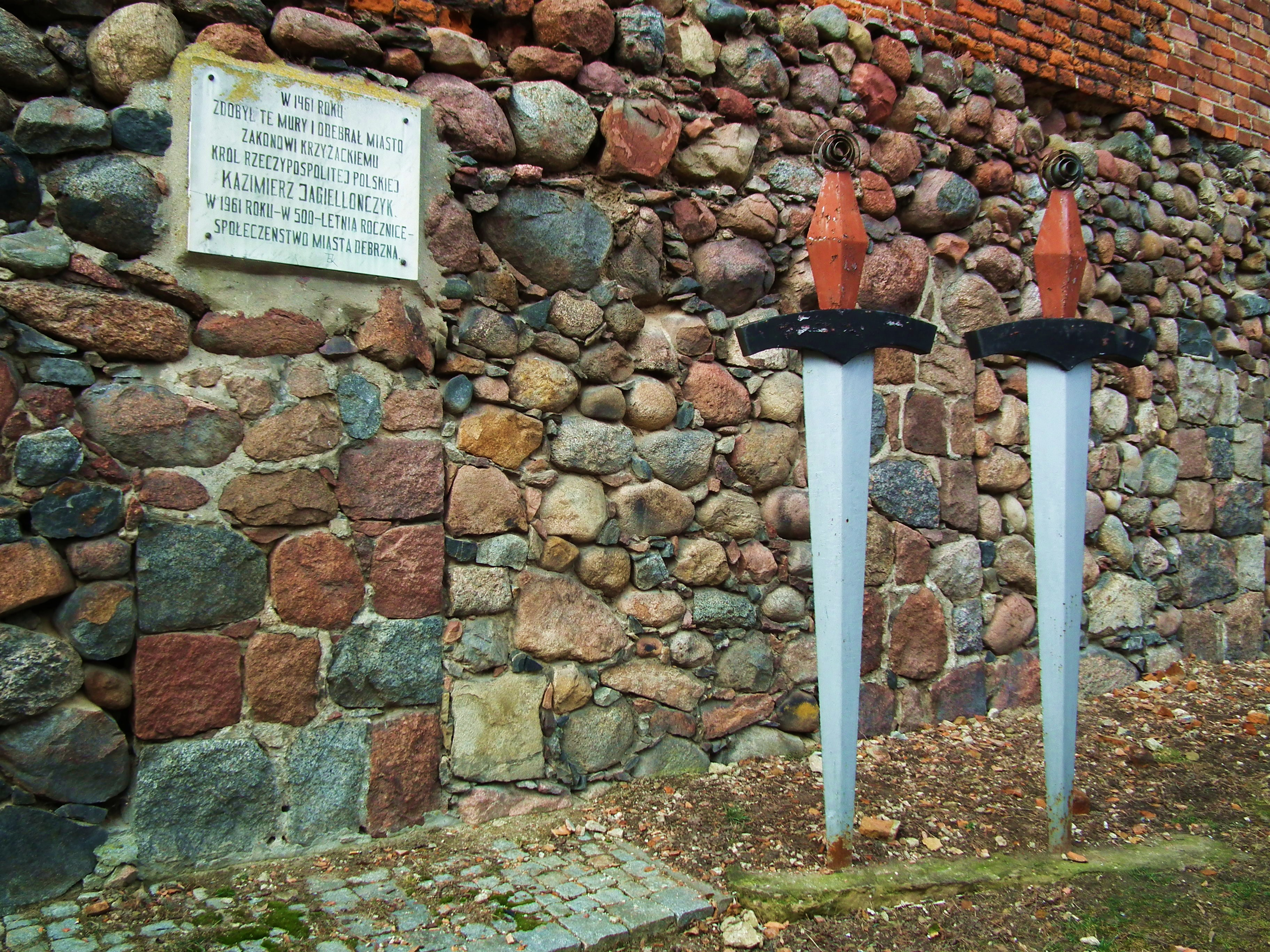
Monument by the defensive wall commemorating the recapture of the town by King Casimir IV Jagiellon in 1461

The first mention of the village dates back to the 12th century. The region was part of medieval Poland before the 14th-century Teutonic invasion. The town was mentioned as Fredeland in a document of 1346, when the manager of the Teutonic Order in Człuchów assigned four Hufen territory to Tylo. 1354 the Grandmaster Winrich von Kniprode granted town rights to the town. After the outbreak of the uprising against the Teutonic Knights, in 1454 the town recognized the Polish King as rightful ruler. During the Thirteen Years' War it was defended against the Teutonic Knights in 1455, but it was later lost again. In 1461 the town was recaptured by King Casimir IV Jagiellon, but later it fell again to the Teutonic Knights. In 1464 the Teutonic Knights left the city, previously plundering and burning it. In the peace treaty signed in Toruń in 1466, the town was recognized by the Teutonic Order as part of Poland, and after twelve years King Casimir IV of Poland confirmed the municipal rights of Debrzno. Administratively it was part of the Pomeranian Voivodeship until the Partitions of Poland. In 1627 the town was plundered by the Swedes.

With the First Partition of Poland in 1772, the town became part of the Kingdom of Prussia under the name Preußisch Friedland and was incorporated into the Province of West Prussia. During the Napoleonic era, Preußisch Friedland suffered a lot, especially in 1806 and 1807, as French soldiers constantly marched through the town and caused an oppressive rise in prices. After the Napoleonic Wars, life gradually returned to normal. In 1871, the town became part of the newly unified German Empire. At the end of the 19th century, many immigrants from the Rhineland moved to the town, which doubled its population.

After World War I, the economic situation deteriorated dramatically as the loss of the province of West Prussia meant that the town was now located on the border with Poland. It became part of the newly established Prussian province of Posen-West Prussia. In 1925, Preußisch Friedland had 3,830 inhabitants, among whom were 2,796 Protestants, 893 Catholics and 118 Jews. In 1938, the province of Posen-West Prussia was dissolved and Preußisch Friedland became part of the Province of Pomerania on 1 October 1938.

Towards the end of World War II, Red Army troops entered Preussisch Friedland on 29 January 1945 but were repulsed. However, they returned on 20 February 1945. 70% of the town was destroyed in the fighting. After the town was conquered by the Soviet troops, atrocities were committed against the civilian population. In the summer of 1945, the town was placed under Polish administration in accordance with the Potsdam Agreement and was renamed Debrzno. The remaining German population was expelled and the town was settled by Poles.

The former military Debrzno Airfield is located nearby.

== Gallery ==
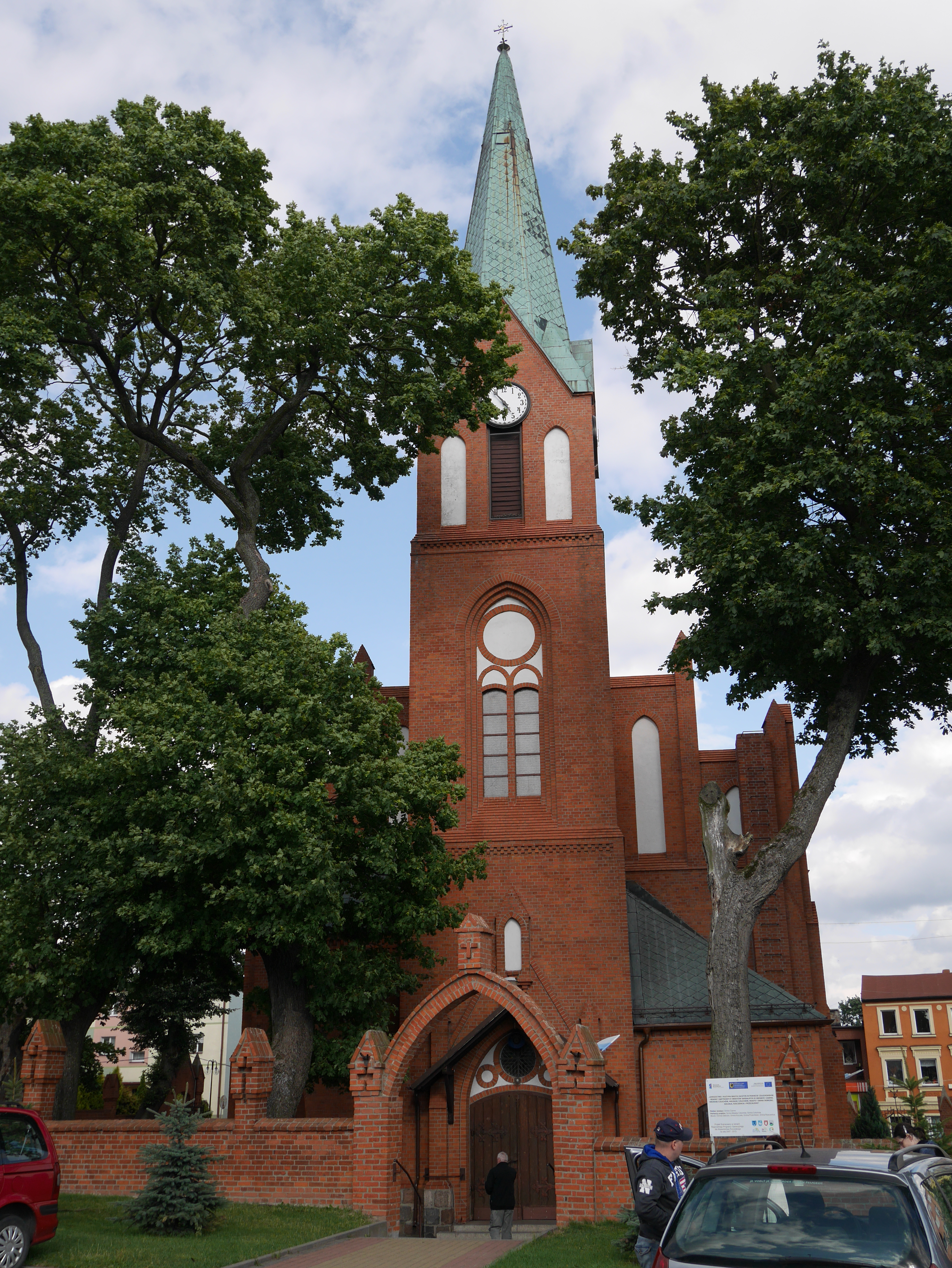
Church of the Assumption

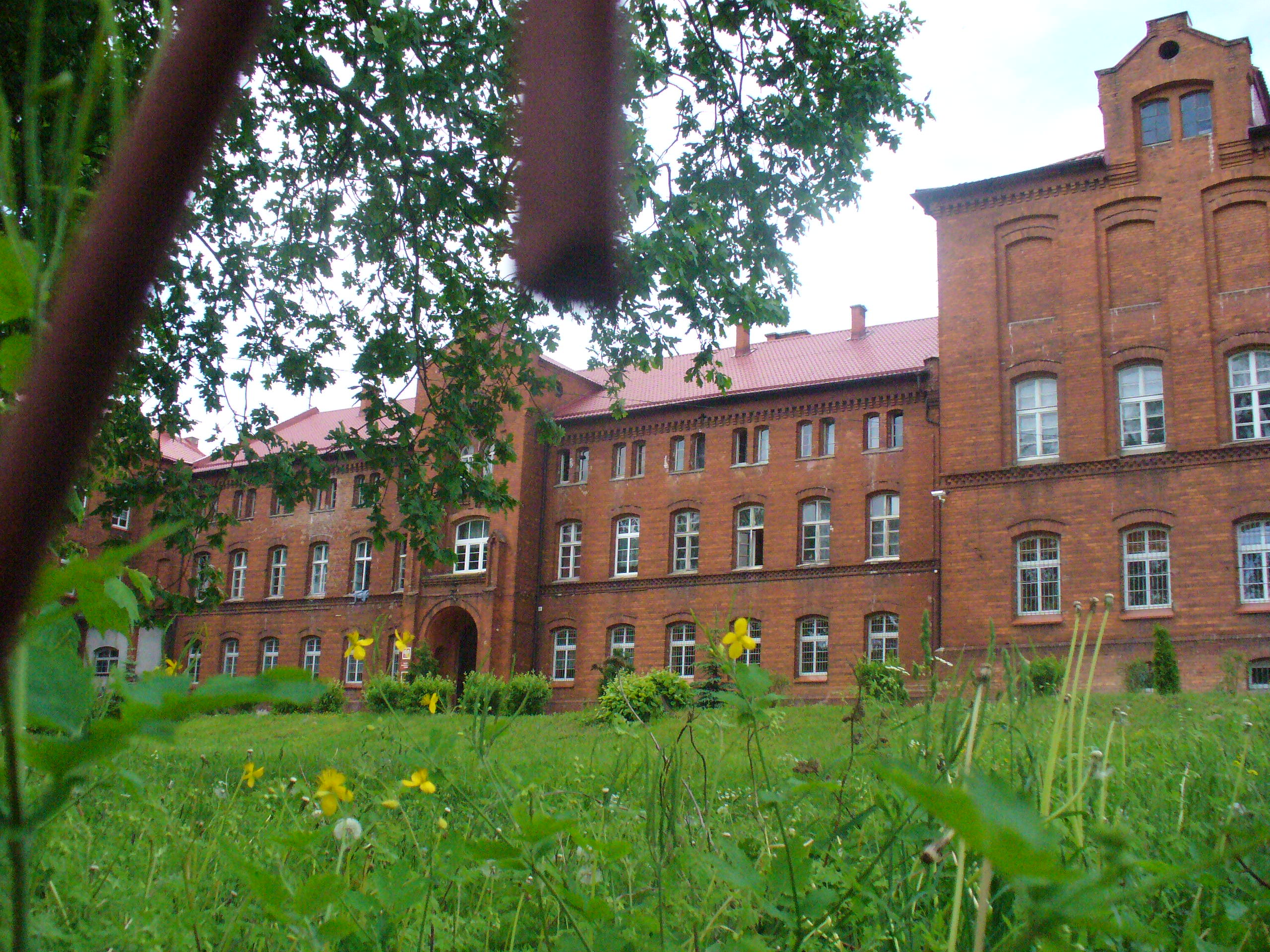
Former Teacher's Seminar

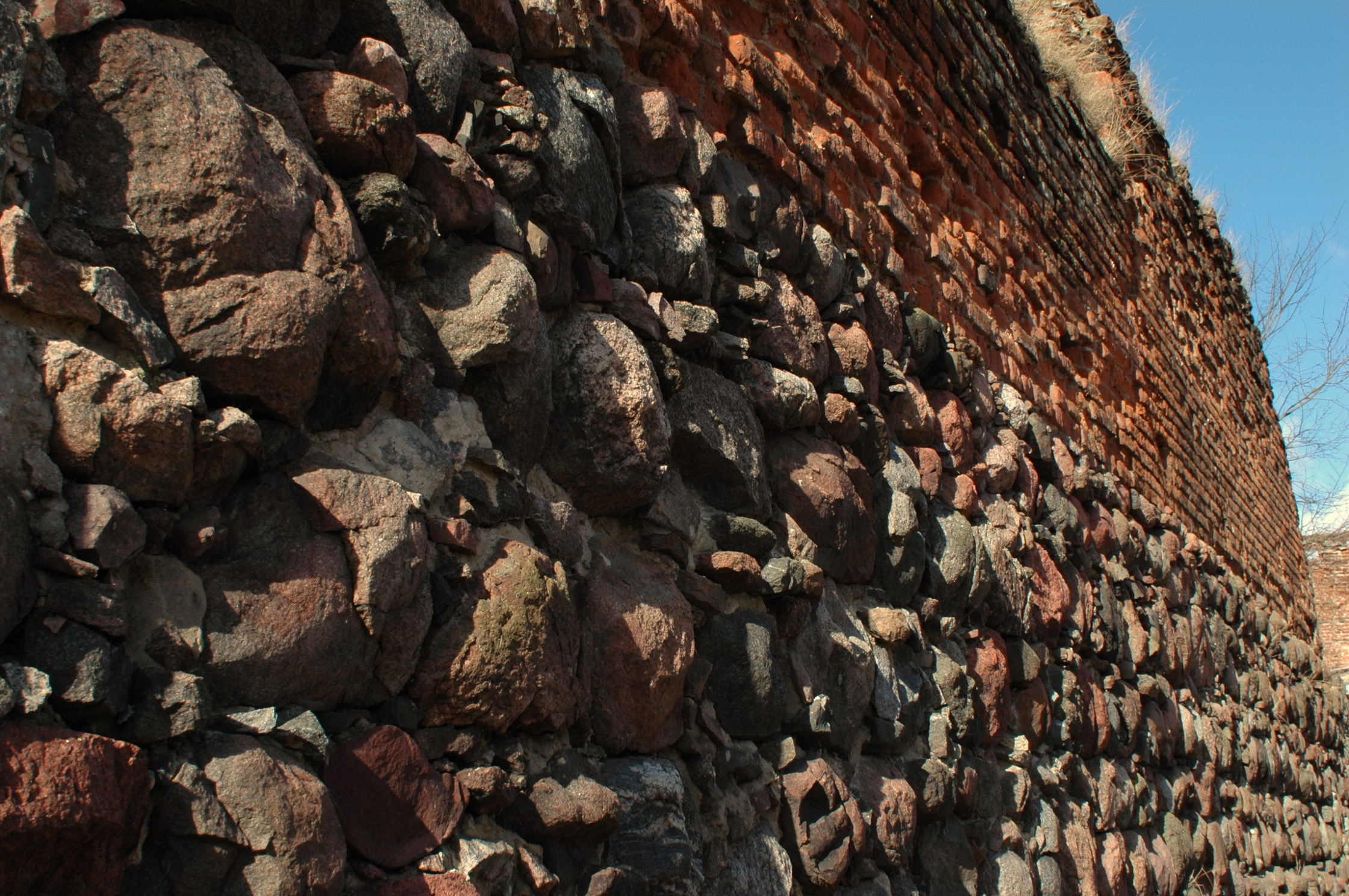
Medieval defensive walls

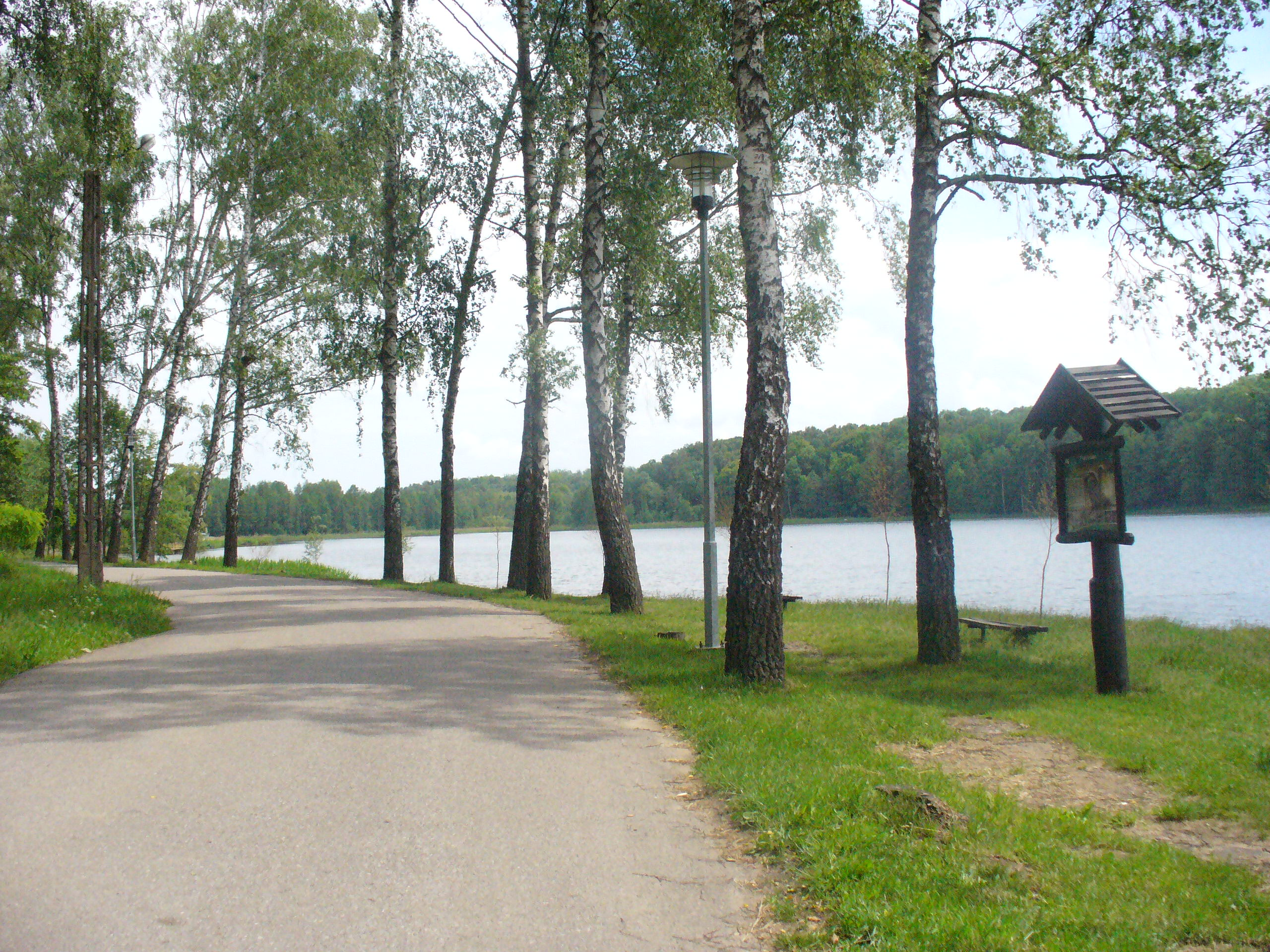
Lake in Debrzno
