= Ariel Jakubowski =

Polish football player and coach

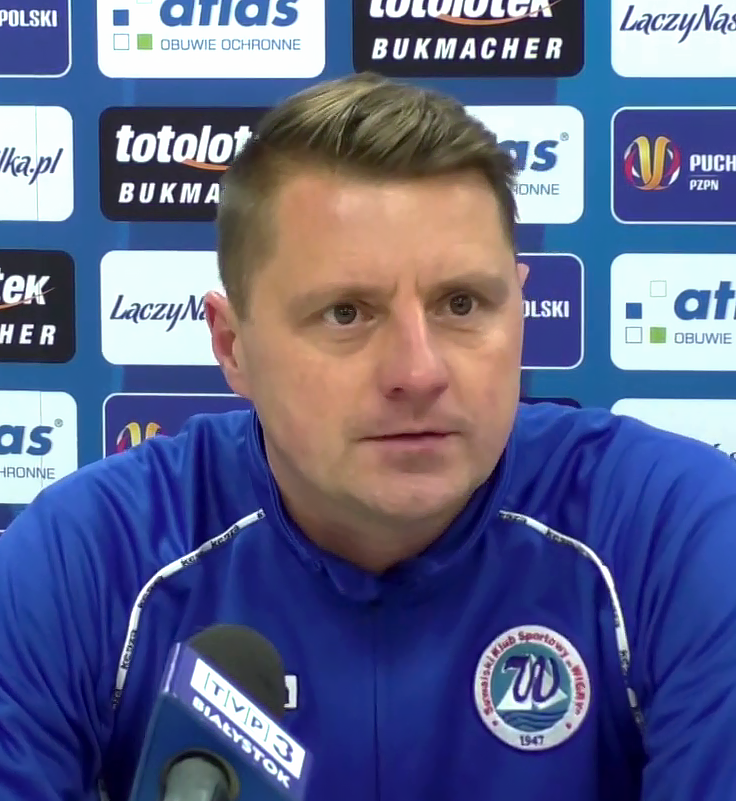
- Jakubowski in 2018

Personal information
- Full name: Ariel Jakubowski
- Date of birth: 7 September 1977 (age 49)
- Place of birth: Człuchów, Poland
- Height: 1.82 m (6 ft 0 in)
- Position: Defender

Senior career*
Years	Team	Apps	(Gls)
1995–1997	Polonia Gdańsk		
1998–2000	ŁKS Łódź	67	(0)
2000–2001	GKS Katowice	27	(0)
2001–2002	Odra Wodzisław	27	(1)
2002–2004	Wisła Płock	39	(0)
2004–2005	Lech Poznań	16	(0)
2005–2006	Jagiellonia Białystok	14	(0)
2007–2011	Ruch Chorzów	85	(0)
2011–2012	Wisła Płock	31	(2)

International career
1999	Poland	1	(0)

Managerial career
- 2013–2016: Ursus Warsaw
- 2017–2018: Ursus Warsaw
- 2018–2019: Wigry Suwałki
- 2019: Elana Toruń
- 2020: Ursus Warsaw (U17)
- 2020–2022: Poland U16 (assistant)
- 2020–2022: Motor Lublin (assistant)
- 2022–2023: Poland U15 (assistant)
- 2022–2023: Ursus Warsaw (U19)
- 2023: Wisła Płock (assistant)
- * Club domestic league appearances and goals

Ariel Jakubowski (born 7 September 1977) is a Polish professional football coach and former player.

== Career ==
=== Club ===
In May 2011, he was released from Ruch Chorzów.

In July 2011, he joined Wisła Płock.

=== International ===
He was a part of Poland national football team. He played one time in 1999.

== Coaching career ==
In January 2020, Jakubowski returned to Ursus Warsaw to coach the club's U17 squad.

== Honours ==
ŁKS Łódź

- Ekstraklasa: 1997–98

Ruch Chorzów

- II liga: 2006–07
