= Pomeranian Voivodeship (1466–1772) =

Former administrative division of the Kingdom of Poland

Coordinates: 54°11′43″N 18°00′59″E

Pomeranian Voivodeship Województwo pomorskie Woiwodschaft Pommerellen
- Voivodeship of Poland¹; Part of Royal Prussia and (from 1569) Greater Poland provinces
- 1466–1772
- Coat of arms

- Pomeranian Voivodeship of the Polish–Lithuanian Commonwealth
- Capital: Skarszewy
- Area
- 12,907 km^{2} (4,983 sq mi)
- History
  - Prussian Uprising: 21 February 1454
  - 2nd Peace of Thorn: 1 October 1466
  - Union of Lublin: 1 July 1569
  - First Partition of Poland: 5 August 1772
- Political subdivisions: counties: 8
| Preceded by | Succeeded by |
| State of the Teutonic Order | West Prussia |
- Today part of: Poland; Russia²
- ¹ Voivodeship of the Polish Crown in the Polish–Lithuanian Commonwealth Voivodeship of the Kingdom of Poland before 1569. ² Small portion of the Vistula Spit around Polski

The Pomeranian Voivodeship (Polish: Województwo pomorskie, German: Woiwodschaft Pommerellen) was a unit of administrative division and local government in the Kingdom of Poland and the Polish–Lithuanian Commonwealth from 1454/1466 until the First partition of Poland in 1772. From 1613 the capital was at Skarszewy (Schöneck).

The voivodeship comprised the westernmost part of the autonomous province of Royal Prussia and, after the Union of Lublin in 1569, the northernmost part of the Greater Poland Province.

== Etymology ==
The name Pomerania derives from the Slavic po more, meaning "by the sea" or "on the sea".

In English sources and generally in German language use, for this historical region the appellation of Pomerelia (German: Pommerellen or Pomerellen, rendered as Pomorze Gdańskie in Polish) prevails, because the name Pomerania (German: Pommern) usually refers to the western Duchy of Pomerania (Polish: Księstwo Pomorskie), ruled by the House of Griffins.

== History ==
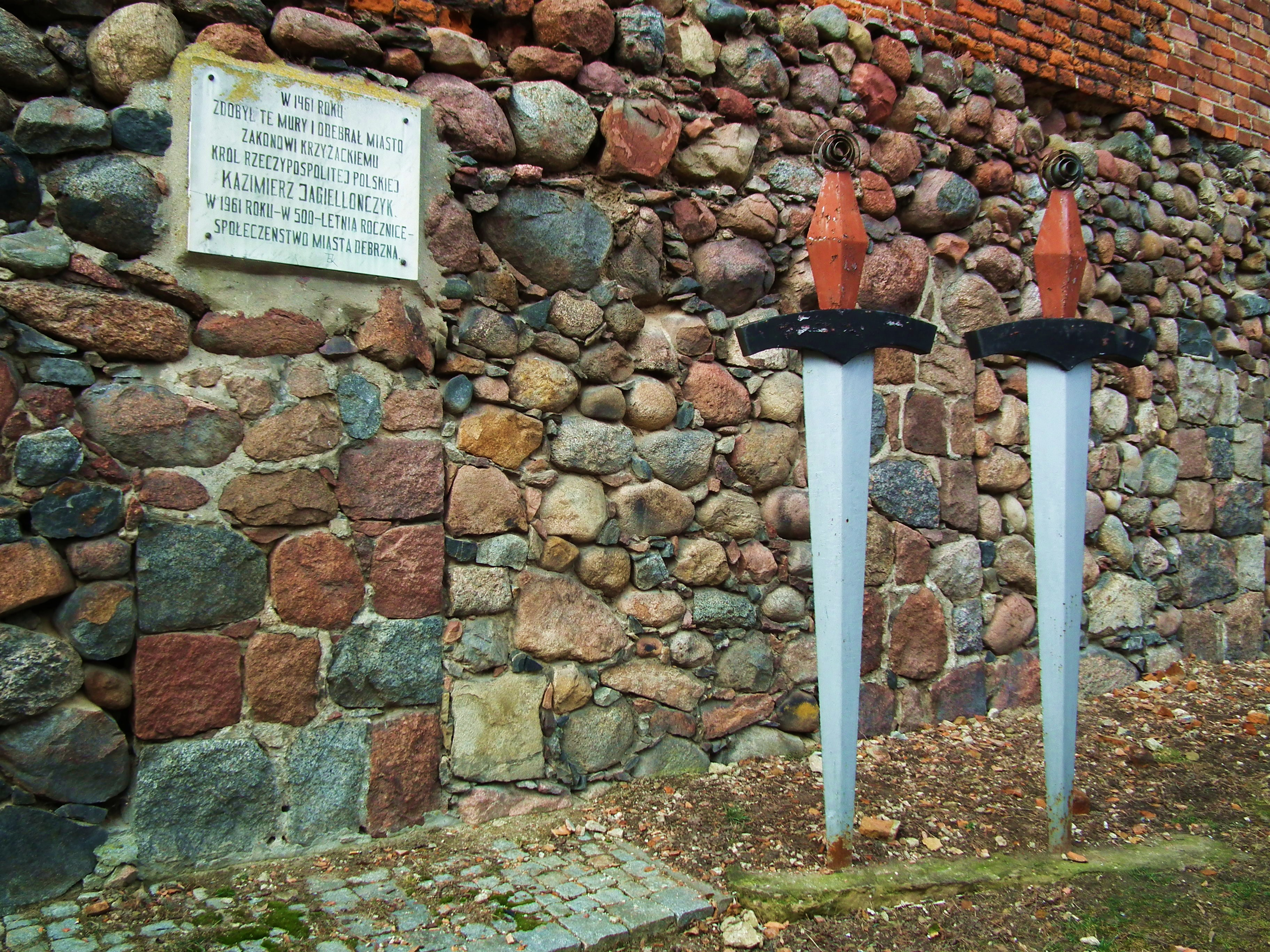
Monument commemorating the recapture of Debrzno from the Teutonic Knights by King Casimir IV Jagiellon in 1461

The voivodeship comprised the historic Pomerelia region, which since the Teutonic takeover of Danzig (Gdańsk) in 1308 had been held by the State of the Teutonic Order.

In 1440, many cities of the region joined the newly formed anti-Teutonic Prussian Confederation. In 1454, the organization asked Polish King Casimir IV Jagiellon to reincorporate the region into the Kingdom of Poland, to which the King agreed and signed an act of re-incorporation in Kraków. After the subsequent Thirteen Years' War, the longest of all Polish–Teutonic wars, the Teutonic Knights renounced any claims to the region and recognized it as part of Poland. Together with the Chełmno (Kulm) and Malbork (Marienburg) voivodeships and the Prince-Bishopric of Warmia (Ermland) it formed the autonomous and multilingual province of Royal Prussia. The autonomy of the region was later abolished as a result of the Union of Lublin in 1569 and the area was fully incorporated into the Kingdom of Poland.

In turn for their support in the Thirteen Years' War, the Griffin dukes in 1455 gained the Pomerelian Lębork and Bytów Land (Lauenburg and Bütow) as a Polish fief, which upon the extinction of the dynasty in 1637 was reincorporated directly into the Pomeranian Voivodeship.

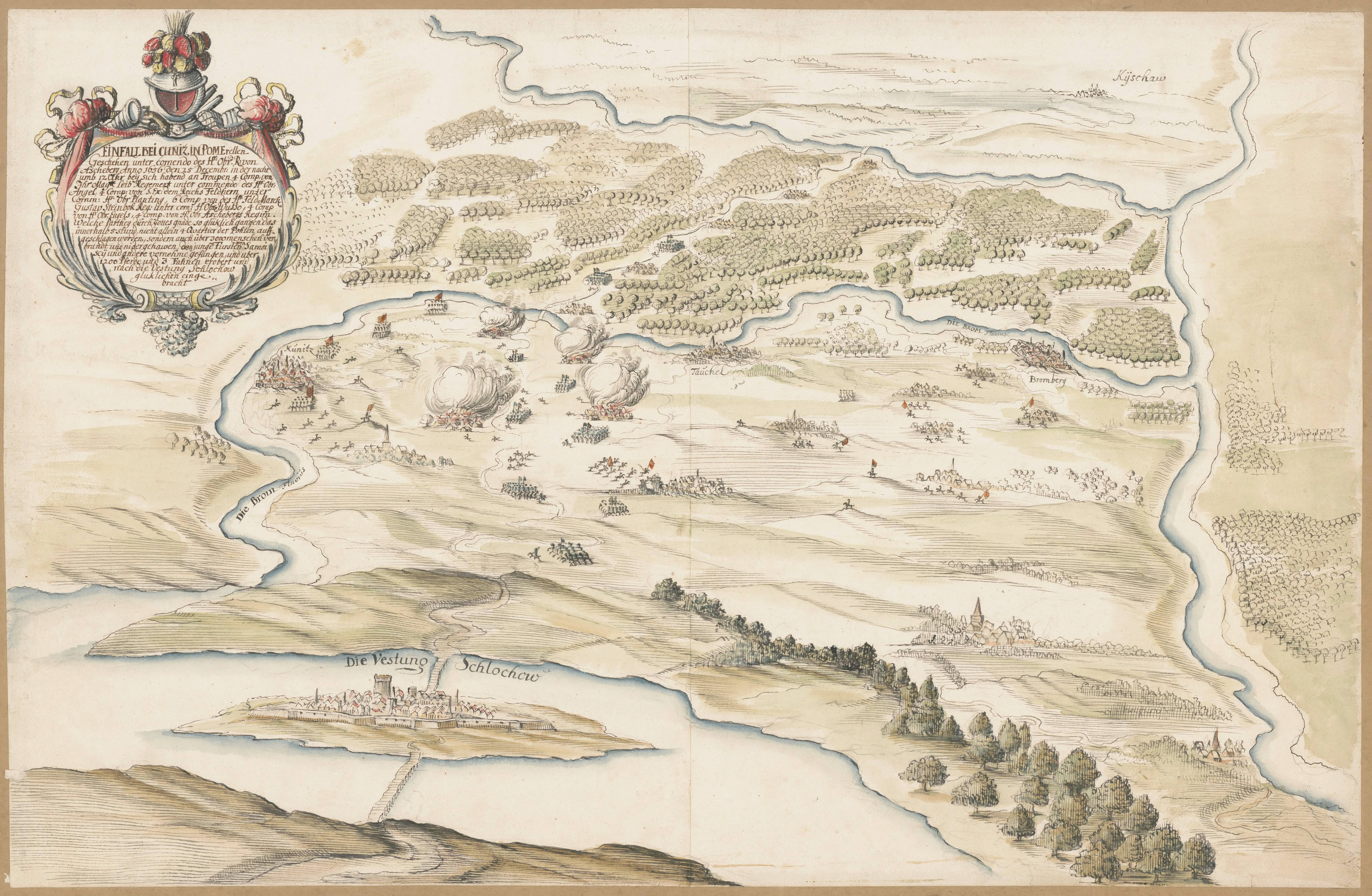
Battle of Człuchów, 1656

In 1571, Denmark conducted a naval raid of Hel. During the Polish–Swedish War of 1626–1629, in 1627, the naval Battle of Oliwa was fought in the area, and it is one of the greatest victories in the history of the Polish Navy. The region was invaded by Sweden during the Swedish invasion of Poland of 1655–1660, commonly known as the Deluge, however, Danzig (Gdańsk) withstood a Swedish siege. The Treaty of Oliva, one of the peace treaties ending the Second Northern War was signed in Oliwa in the Pomeranian Voivodeship. In 1677, a Polish-Swedish alliance was signed in Danzig.

After the 1618 personal union of the Polish vassal Ducal Prussia and the Margraviate of Brandenburg under the rising House of Hohenzollern, the Pomeranian Voivodeship separated the two territories. By the 1657 Treaty of Bromberg, Poland had given up suzerainty over Ducal Prussia and granted the Lębork and Bytów Land as a Polish fief to Brandenburg, who also ruled over the adjacent Imperial Pomerania Province. As the margraves had assumed the title of a King in Prussia in 1701, the Hohenzollerns sought to link their territories. On the eve of the Polish partitions, King Frederick II of Prussia in 1771 finally incorporated Lauenburg and Bütow into the Pomerania Province. In the course of the First Partition of Poland the next year, he furthermore annexed the Pomeranian Voivodeship with most of Royal Prussia, then renamed as the Province of West Prussia – except for the port city of Danzig, which was not incorporated until the Second Partition of 1793.

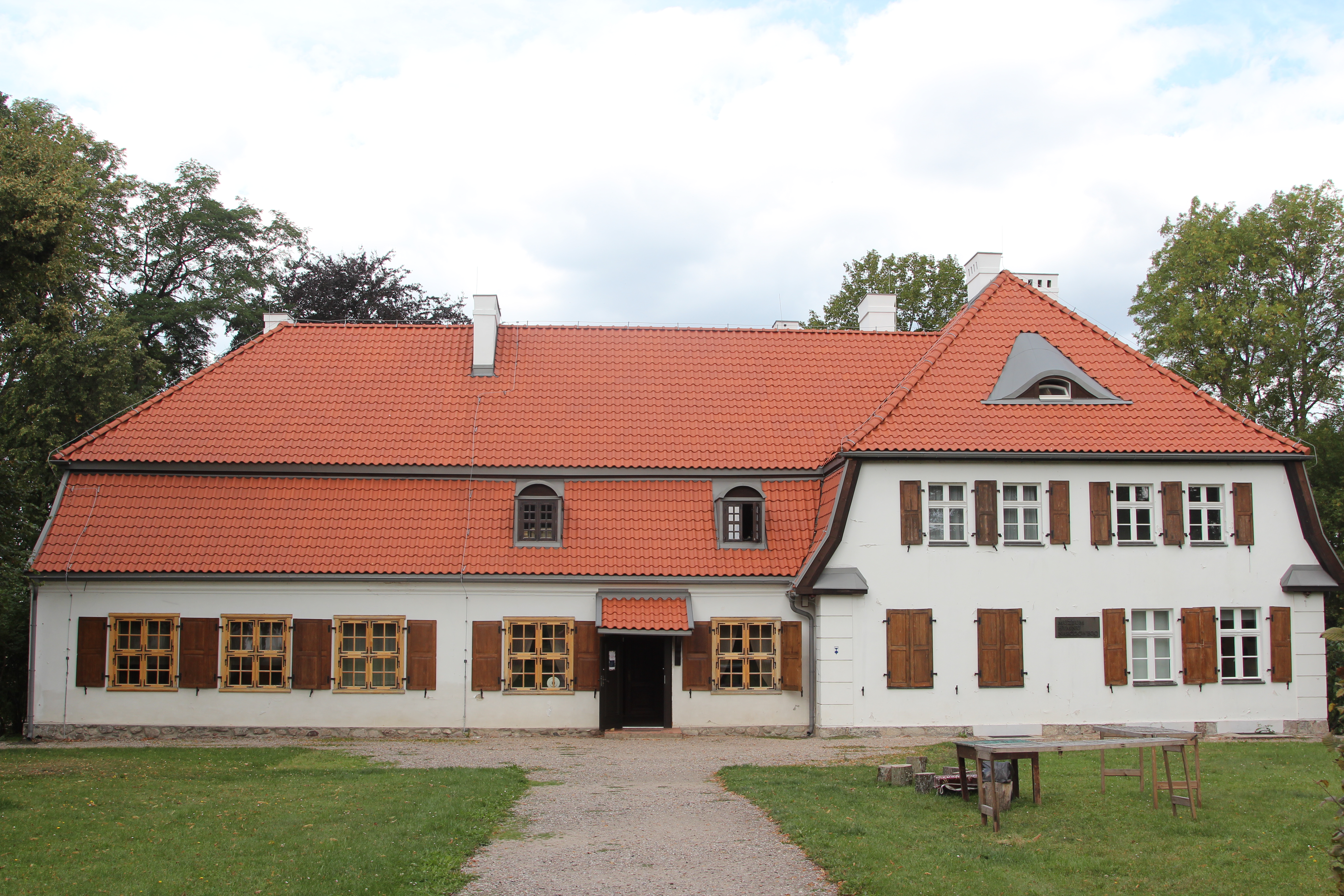
Birthplace and childhood home of Józef Wybicki in Będomin, now the Museum of the National Anthem of Poland

Józef Wybicki, author of the lyrics to the national anthem of Poland, hailed from the region, as he was born in Będomin, attended a college in Stare Szkoty and studied law at the local court in Skarszewy, the capital of the voivodeship.

Today the historic administrative region roughly corresponds to the present-day Pomeranian Voivodeship of Poland, which also comprises the Lębork and Bytów Land as well as part of the territory of the former Malbork Voivodeship, that until 1230 had been part of the Prussian tribal territory.

== Administration ==
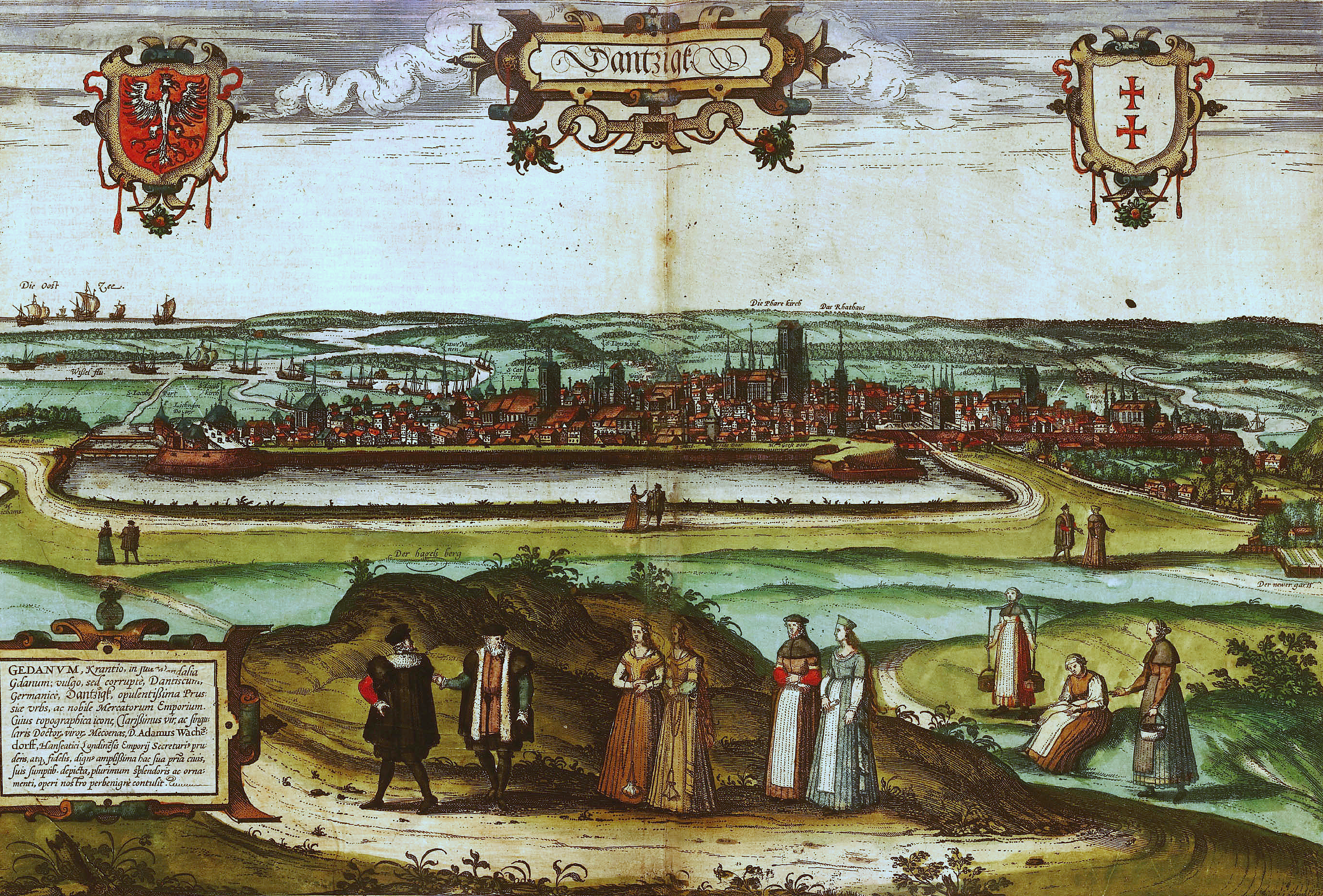
Danzig (Gdańsk), the largest city of the voivodeship, in the 16th century

Voivodeship Governor (Wojewoda) seat:

- Skarszewy

Regional council (sejmik generalny)

- Starogard Gdański

Regional councils (sejmik poselski i deputacki)

- Człuchów
- Tuchola
- Świecie
- Starogród
- Puck

Administrative divisions:

- Człuchów County, (Powiat Człuchowski), Człuchów
- Gdańsk County, (Powiat Gdański), Gdańsk
- Koscierzyna County, (Powiat Kościerzyński), Kościerzyna
- Mirachowo County, (Powiat Mirachowski), Mirachowo
- Nowe County, (Powiat Nowski), Nowe
- Puck County, (Powiat Pucki), Puck
- Skarszewy County, (Powiat Skarszewski), Skarszewy
- Stargard County, (Powiat Starogrodzki) Starogard Gdański
- Świecie County, (Powiat Świecki), Świecie
- Tczew County, (Powiat Tczewski), Tczew
- Tuchola County, (Powiat Tucholski), Tuchola

From 1637 to 1657, the Lębork and Bytów Land.

== Cities and towns ==
The largest city of the voivodeship was Gdańsk, which as one of the largest and most influential cities of entire Poland enjoyed voting rights during the Royal free elections. Since 1454, Gdańsk was authorized by King Casimir IV to mint Polish coins. Gdańsk was visited by Nicolaus Copernicus in 1504 and 1526, and Narratio Prima, the first printed publication of his heliocentric theory, was published there in 1540. In 1587, Sigismund III Vasa swore the pacta conventa in Oliwa near Gdańsk prior to his coronation as King of Poland. According to Zygmunt Gloger, during the rule of Sigismund III Vasa, Gdańsk was one of the two largest cities of Poland (alongside Kraków), and one of the three largest cities in Slavic countries (alongside Kraków and Prague). Around 1640, Johannes Hevelius established his astronomical observatory in Gdańsk, which was regularly visited by Polish King John III Sobieski.

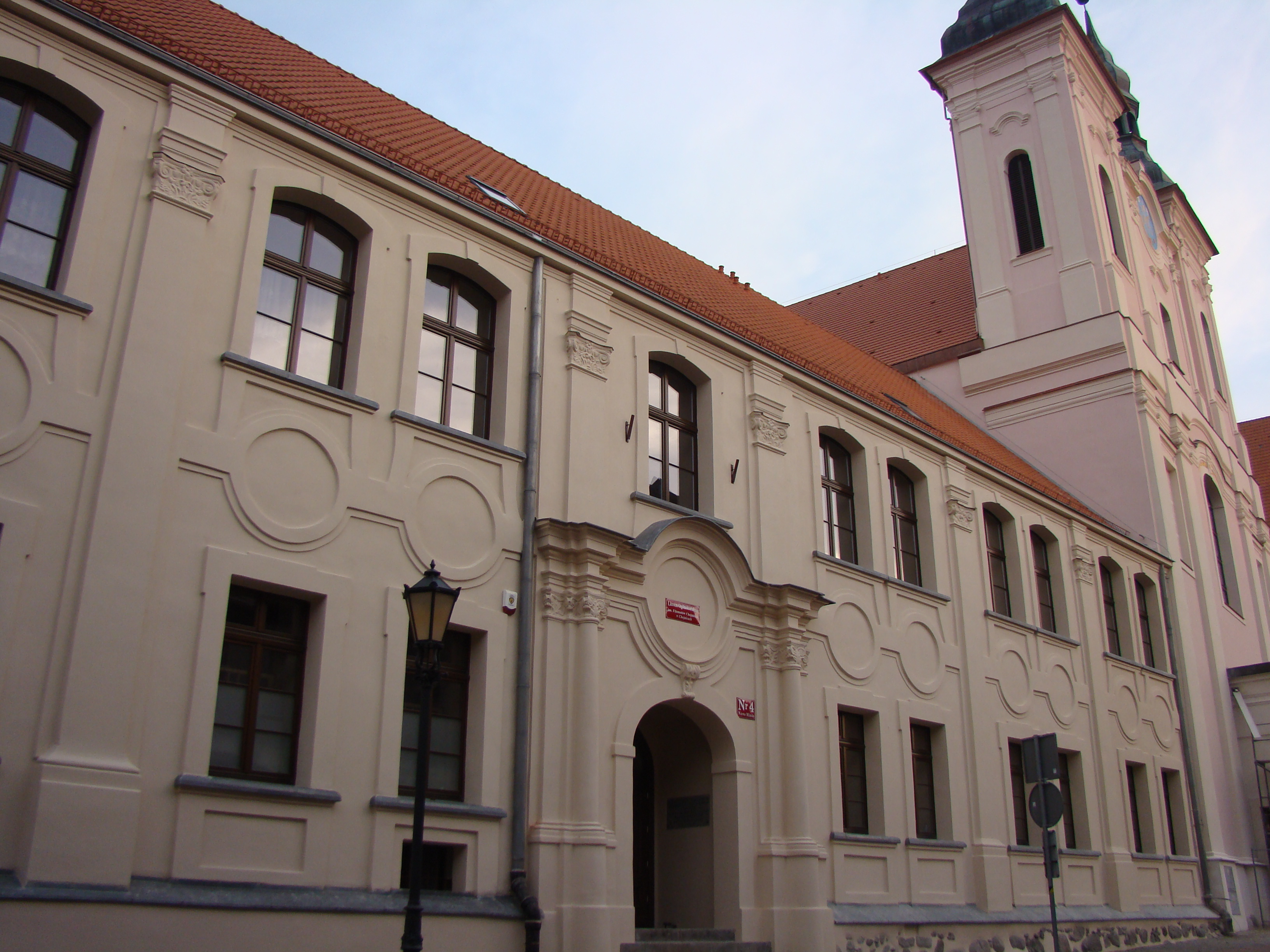
Liceum Ogólnokształcące im. Filomatów Chojnickich in Chojnice, one of the oldest high schools in Poland, est. in 1622

Other royal cities and towns were Biały Bór, Chojnice, Czarne, Człuchów, Debrzno, Gniew, Kościerzyna, Nowe, Puck, Starogard, Świecie, Tuchola, Tczew and the voivodeship capital Skarszewy. Chojnice was an important center of cloth production in Poland. Cloth production was the main branch of the town's economy, and in 1570, clothiers constituted 36% of all craftsmen in the town. To this day, one of the main streets in the town center is called Ulica Sukienników ("Clothiers' Street"). In the second half of the 17th century, prior to becoming King of Poland, John III Sobieski served as the starost of Gniew and built the Marysieńka Palace for his wife, Queen Marie Casimire, there. The towns of Bytów, Lębork and Łeba were part of the voivodeship from 1637 to 1657, and in 1643 the town of Wejherowo was founded.

== See also ==
- Pomeranian Voivodeship (1919–1939)

== Bibliography ==
- Górski, Karol (1949). Związek Pruski i poddanie się Prus Polsce: zbiór tekstów źródłowych (in Polish and Latin). Poznań: Instytut Zachodni.
