= Człuchów County =

Człuchów County Powiat człuchowski
- County
- Flag Coat of arms

- Coordinates (Człuchów): 53°39′N 17°22′E
- Country: Poland
- Voivodeship: Pomeranian
- Seat: Człuchów
- Gminas: Total 7 (incl. 1 urban): Człuchów; Gmina Czarne; Gmina Człuchów; Gmina Debrzno; Gmina Koczała; Gmina Przechlewo; Gmina Rzeczenica

Area
  - Total: 1,574.41 km^{2} (607.88 sq mi)

Population (2019)
  - Total: 56,225
  - Density: 35.712/km^{2} (92.493/sq mi)
  - Urban: 24,677
  - Rural: 31,548
- Car plates: GCZ
- Website: www.starostwo.czluchow.org.pl

Człuchów County (Kashubian: Człëchòwsczi kréz, Polish: powiat człuchowski) is a unit of territorial administration and local government (powiat) in Pomeranian Voivodeship, northern Poland. It came into being on January 1, 1999, as a result of the Polish local government reforms passed in 1998. Its administrative seat and largest town is Człuchów, which lies 115 kilometres (71 mi) south-west of the regional capital Gdańsk. The county also contains the towns of Czarne, lying 28 km (17 mi) west of Człuchów, and Debrzno, 16 km (10 mi) south-west of Człuchów.

The county covers an area of 1,574.41 square kilometres (607.9 sq mi). As of 2019 its total population is 56,225, out of which the population of Człuchów is 13,649, that of Czarne is 5,932, that of Debrzno is 5,096, and the rural population is 30,924.

Człuchów County on a map of the counties of Pomeranian Voivodeship

Człuchów County is bordered by Bytów County to the north, Chojnice County to the east, Sępólno County to the south, Złotów County to the south-west and Szczecinek County to the west.

== Administrative divisions ==
The county is subdivided into seven gminas (one urban, two urban-rural and four rural). These are listed in the following table, in descending order of population.

Gmina	Type	Area (km^{2})	Population (2019)	Seat
Człuchów	urban	12.5	13,649	
Gmina Człuchów	rural	361.7	11,116	Człuchów *
Gmina Czarne	urban-rural	234.9	9,101	Czarne
Gmina Debrzno	urban-rural	224.2	9,037	Debrzno
Gmina Przechlewo	rural	243.9	6,331	Przechlewo
Gmina Rzeczenica	rural	274.9	3,624	Rzeczenica
Gmina Koczała	rural	222.4	3,367	Koczała
* seat not part of the gmina

== County affiliation ==
In the years 1945–1999, the area of the Człuchów county exceptionally frequently changed its administrative affiliation:

- 1945-1946 was subordinated to Bydgoszcz
- 1946-1950 was subordinated to Szczecin
- 1950-1975 was subordinated to Koszalin
- 1975-1998 was subordinated to Słupsk
- from 1999 was subordinated to Gdańsk
