= Kamenná =

Kamenná may refer to places:

== Czech Republic ==
- Kamenná (České Budějovice District), a municipality and village in the South Bohemian Region
- Kamenná (Jihlava District), a municipality and village in the Vysočina Region
- Kamenná (Šumperk District), a municipality and village in the Olomouc Region
- Kamenná (Třebíč District), a municipality and village in the Vysočina Region
- Kamenná, a village and part of Jílové in the Ústí nad Labem Region
- Kamenná, a village and part of Krásná (Cheb District) in the Karlovy Vary Region
- Kamenná, a village and part of Milín in the Central Bohemian Region
- Kamenná Horka, a municipality and village in the Pardubice Region
- Kamenná Lhota, a municipality and village in the Vysočina Region

== Slovakia ==
- Kamenná Poruba, Vranov nad Topľou District, a municipality and village in the Prešov Region
- Kamenná Poruba, Žilina District, a municipality and village in the Žilina Region
