= Poruba =

Poruba may refer to:

Czech Republic

- Poruba (Orlová), a village, now administratively a part of the town of Orlová
- Poruba (Ostrava), a district of the city of Ostrava

Slovakia

- Dolná Poruba, a village in Trenčín District
- Kamenná Poruba, Žilina District, a village in Žilina District
- Kamenná Poruba, Vranov nad Topľou District, a village in Vranov nad Topľou District
- Poruba, Prievidza District, a village in Prievidza District
- Poruba pod Vihorlatom, a village in Michalovce District
- Ruská Poruba, a village in Humenné District
- Šarišská Poruba, a village in Prešov District
- Veterná Poruba, a village in Liptovský Mikuláš District
- Závažná Poruba, a village in Liptovský Mikuláš District

== See also ==
- Poręba (disambiguation)
