= Józef Cyrek =

Polish writer (1904–1940)

Józef Cyrek

Józef Cyrek (13 September 1904 –2 September 1940) was a Polish Jesuit and writer who shortly after the Nazi invasion of Poland was arrested by the Gestapo, imprisoned at several places of detention, and lastly deported to the Auschwitz concentration camp where he was murdered.

He has in recent years been accorded the title of Servant of God and is in the process of being beatified by the Catholic Church.

== Life and death ==
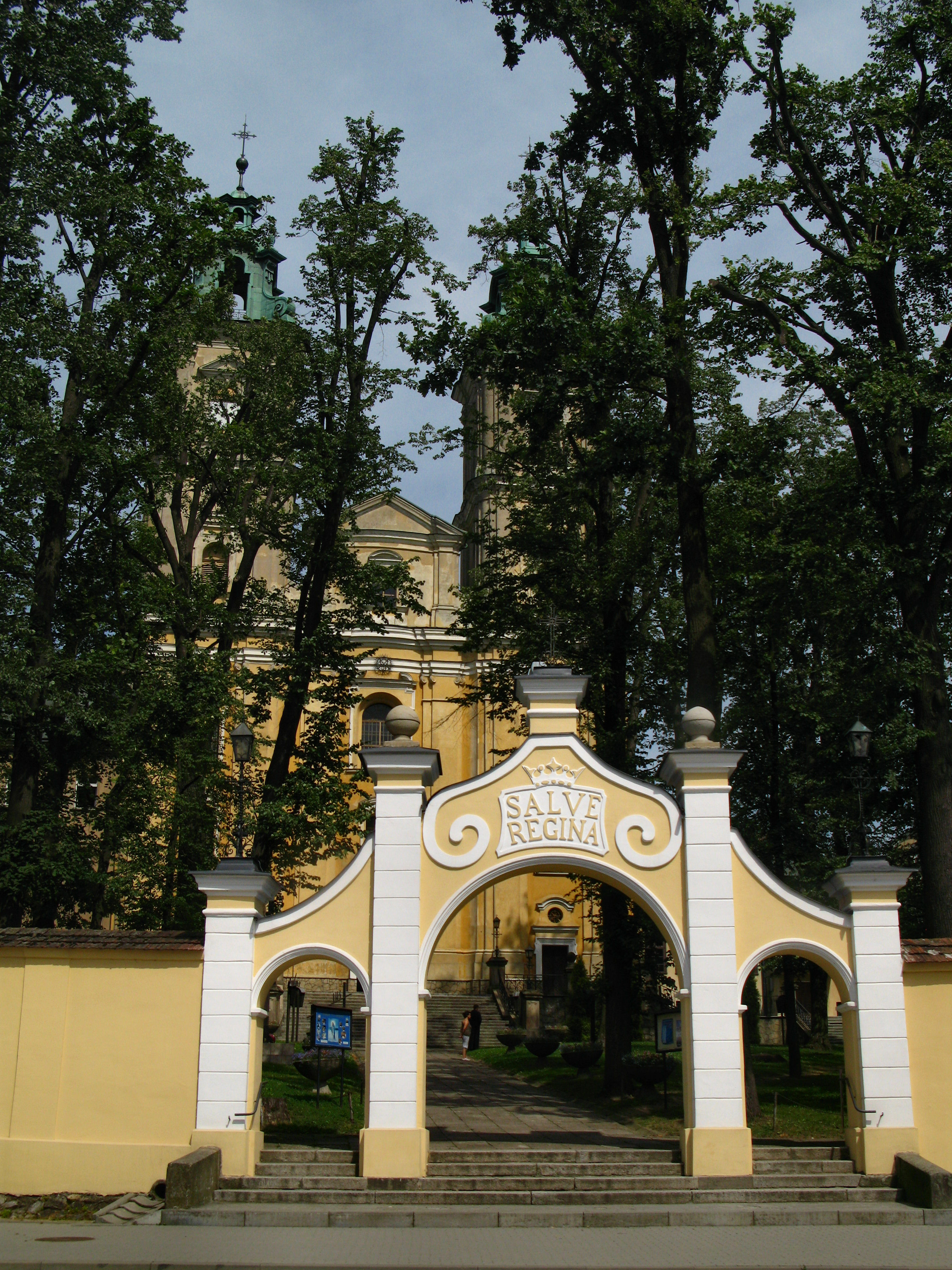
The Jesuit complex at Stara Wieś site of Józef Cyrek's novitiate

Józef Cyrek was born in Bysina, a village some 34 kilometres (21 mi) south of Kraków, on 13 September 1904 – when the area was under Austrian occupation – to the family of Józef Cyrek, a farmer, and his wife Barbara née Sobal who died when Cyrek was 18-months' old. Cyrek was thus from his earliest years inured to physical work having been obliged to help out with the agricultural work of the family. He went to school at Bysina and at nearby Myślenice, continuing secondary education in Kraków and in Pińsk in Poland (now Pinsk in Belarus). During his secondary studies he entered the Society at Stara Wieś (already in independent Poland; see picture to the right) on 6 December 1924. He studied in Kraków at Jagiellonian University (philosophy) and in Belgium at Louvain (theology), where he also took holy orders on 24 August 1934. After his return to Poland in 1935 Cyrek worked for the religious publisher, the Wydawnictwo Apostolstwa Modlitwy ("Publications of the Apostleship of Prayer") of Kraków, the oldest Catholic publishing house in Poland (now called the Wydawnictwo WAM). In 1938 he became the editor of the periodical Hostia ("The Host"), an organ of the Eucharistic Crusade (see Croisade eucharistique), becoming the chief secretary of the movement. In May of the same year he participated in the 34th Eucharistic Congress in Budapest.

As a writer Cyrek authored two biographies, one of Piotr Skarga (1536–1612), a Counter-Reformation figure whose sermons have been compared with those of Jacques-Bénigne Bossuet (published in 1936); and another of Stanislaus Kostka, a Polish saint of the sixteenth century who at the age of 16 fled from his boarding school to pursue a religious vocation and died of malaria two years later (and whose relics repose at the church of Sant'Andrea al Quirinale in Rome): Cyrek's biography of Kostka was published in 1937. It is however the simple catechism that Cyrek wrote for children in 1938 that has been most widely praised, and awarded with a prize by the government of the Second Polish Republic. He was also a prolific contributor to such periodicals as Przegląd Powszechny (see Przegląd Powszechny), Wiara i Życie (see Wiara i Życie), Misje Katolickie (see Misje Katolickie), Młody Las (see Młody Las), and Posłaniec Serca Jezusowego (see Posłaniec Serca Jezusowego), an organ of the Apostleship of Prayer movement.

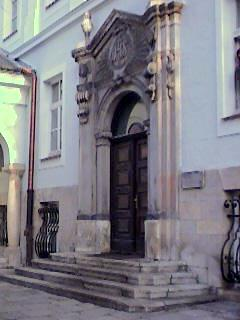
The Cracoviense Collegium Maximum SS. Cordis Iesu place of Józef Cyrek's arrest by the Gestapo

On 6 November 1939, just sixty-six days after the Nazi invasion of Poland, the Gestapo carried out the so-called Sonderaktion Krakau, an operation in which virtually all of the professors of the Jagiellonian University of Kraków were arrested and imprisoned in the ulica Montelupich as part of the larger plan of Nazi Germany to eliminate all Polish intelligentsia.

Four days later, on 10 November 1939, Cyrek was arrested by the Gestapo together with 24 other Jesuits of the Jesuit College of Kraków (the Cracoviense Collegium Maximum SS. Cordis Iesu, see picture to the right) – eight of them employees of the Jesuit publishing house Wydawnictwo Apostolstwa Modlitwy – and likewise imprisoned in the ulica Montelupich Prison. (The date of 10 November 1939 however did not mark the first Gestapo visit to the Jesuit Collegium, as the premises were twice before subjected to searches, on 14 October 1939 and 16 October 1939, the first search being the occasion of the arrest of the rector of the college, Wiktor Macko, and Stanisław Bednarski, the director of the publishing house.) Although the Jesuits were never informed of the reasons for their arrest, it was clear that they opposed the vision of the Nazis and for that reason were treated as the enemies of the Third Reich.

After a detention of c. 43 days in duration at Montelupich, Dembowski was transferred on or about 23 December 1939, together with the other arrested Jesuits, to another notorious Gestapo prison at Nowy Wiśnicz, in reality (if not in name) a Nazi extermination camp in which prisoners were worked to death. On 20 June 1940, after six months (180 days) at Nowy Wiśnicz, Cyrek, together with the other Jesuit prisoners, was deported to the Auschwitz concentration camp, then in the process of being formed.

At Auschwitz Cyrek was accorded a particularly brutal treatment in a penal company, the so-called Strafkompanie consisting of several prisoners whose gruelling tasks included pushing an enormous road roller with which they had to level the Appellplatz (roll-call ground). In addition, he was singled out for special tortures associated with the taunts directed at his Christian faith described in a recent book (2005) by Iwona Urbańska. Cyrek died in the camp's Revier or infirmary – as a result of exhaustion, starvation, and the beatings he had received – on 2 September 1940, that is, seventy-four days after arrival (9 months and 23 days after the initial arrest). He was the first of the group of 25 Jesuit prisoners arrested on 10 November 1939 to die in captivity. Cyrek was 35-years' old – just eleven days short of his thirty-sixth birthday. His personality has been described in his Auschwitz memoirs by a fellow prisoner, Adam Kozłowiecki, the future cardinal, who speaks of Cyrek's "extraordinary goodness and his delicacy in his engagement with his social environment". The Belgian magazine Lumen Vitae sums up his life by observing that:

The fate of Fr. Cyrek is rather symptomatic of the plight of the Church in Poland all through the long dark years of the war and of the Nazi occupation.

Józef Cyrek is currently one of the 122 Polish martyrs of the Second World War who are included in the beatification process initiated in 1994, whose first beatification session was held in Warsaw in 2003 (see Słudzy Boży). A person nominated for beatification receives within the Roman Catholic Church the title of "Servant of God"; once he is actually beatified he is accorded the title of "Blessed", a prerequisite for sainthood conferred in a process known as canonization.

Cyrek's name is incorporated in the bronze plaque that hangs on a courtyard wall outside the Finucane Jesuit Center at Rockhurst University in Kansas City, Missouri, commemorating 152 Jesuit victims of the Nazis during the Second World War.

== Works ==
- Wielki sługa Boży ks. Piotr Skarga Towarzystwa Jezusowego ("Piotr Skarga of the Society of Jesus"; 1936)
- Twój wzór św. Stanisława Kostka: dla młodzieży polskiej ("St. Stanislaus Kostka as an Example for the Polish Youth"; 1937)
- Katechizm dla polskich dzieci ("Catechism for Polish Children"; 1938)
- Adoracje dla Krucjaty Eucharystycznej ("Prayers of Adoration for the Croisade eucharistique", 1939)
- Katechizm: wydanie nowe katechizmu Józefa Cyrka dostosowane do wymagań Soboru Watykańskiego II ("Cyrek's Catechism revised in the light of the Second Vatican Council"; ed. Jan Charytański, et al.; 1968)

=== Works by others edited by Józef Cyrek ===
- Józef Bok (1886–1952), Przewodnik Krucjaty Eucharystycznej czyli Rycerstwa Jezusowego (1939)

== Bibliography ==
- Władysław Szołdrski, Martyrologium duchowieństwa polskiego pod okupacją niemiecką w latach 1939–1945 = Martyrologium cleri Polonici sub occupatione Germanica 1939–1945, Rome, Sacrum Poloniae Millennium, 1965, page 437. Google Books
- Sacrum Poloniae millennium: rozprawy, szkice, materiały historyczne, vol. 11, Rome, Typis Pontificiae Universitatis Gregorianae, 1965, page 70.
- Adam Kozłowiecki, Ucisk i strapienie: pamiętnik więźnia, 1939–1945, ed. J. Humeński, Kraków, Wydawnictwo Apostolstwa Modlitwy, 1967. (Recollections of Cyrek's fellow prisoner.) Google Books
- Wiesław Jan Wysocki, Bóg na nieludzkiej ziemi: życie religijne w hitlerowskich obozach koncentracyjnych (Oświęcim – Majdanek – Stutthof), Warsaw, PAX, 1982. ISBN 8321102948. Google Books
- Stanisław Podlewski, Wierni Bogu i Ojczyźnie: duchowieństwo katolickie w walce o niepodległość Polski w II wojnie światowej, 3rd ed., Warsaw, Novum: Wydawnictwo Chrześcijańskiego Stowarzyszenia Społęcznego, 1985, pages 181, 185, 197. (1st ed., 1971.) Google Books
- Vincent A. Lapomarda, The Jesuits and the Third Reich, Lewiston (New York), Edwin Mellen Press, 1989. ISBN 0889468281. Google Books
- Bolesław Przybyszewski, Adam Stefan Kardynał Sapieha — Pasterz Dobry, Książę Niezłomny: 1867–1951, Łańcut, De arte, 2002, page 170. ISBN 978-83-901405-0-6.
- Iwona Urbańska, Życie kulturalne więźniów w KL Auschwitz w świetle relacji i pamiętników, Toruń, Wydawnictwo Adam Marszałek, 2005. ISBN 8374410019.
- Stanisław Cieślak, Oblicza cierpienia i miłości: Słudzy Boży jezuici — męczennicy z II wojny światowej, Kraków, Wydawnictwo WAM, 2009. ISBN 9788375053470. Google Books

== See also ==
- 108 Martyrs of World War II
- World War II casualties of Poland
