= Smug (disambiguation) =

Smug may refer to:

- Smug, an administrative district in Poland
- Sexual Minorities Uganda, an organisation in Uganda
- Smug Alert!, an episode in the television series South Park
- SMUG1, an enzyme
- as word , being highly self-satisfied or being trim or smart in dress

== See also ==
- Smuga, a geographic area in Poland
- Smugi (disambiguation), other districts in Poland
