= Kamenná Poruba =

Kamenná Poruba may refer to several villages and municipalities in Slovakia:

- Kamenná Poruba, Vranov nad Topľou District
- Kamenná Poruba, Žilina District
