= Bolesławowo =

Bolesławowo may refer to the following places:

- Bolesławowo, Greater Poland Voivodeship (west-central Poland)
- Bolesławowo, Masovian Voivodeship (east-central Poland)
- Bolesławowo, Człuchów County in Pomeranian Voivodeship (north Poland)
- Bolesławowo, Starogard County in Pomeranian Voivodeship (north Poland)
