= Stanisławka =

Stanisławka may refer to the following places:

- Stanisławka, Nakło County in Kuyavian-Pomeranian Voivodeship (north-central Poland)
- Stanisławka, Toruń County in Kuyavian-Pomeranian Voivodeship (north-central Poland)
- Stanisławka, Puławy County in Lublin Voivodeship (east Poland)
- Stanisławka, Zamość County in Lublin Voivodeship (east Poland)
- Stanisławka, Pomeranian Voivodeship (north Poland)
