= Teodor Żychliński =

Polish heraldic, diarist, journalist and editor

Teodor Żychliński (25 June 1830, Grzymisław – 26 August 1909, Poznań) was a Polish heraldic, diarist and journalist, editor of "Dziennik Poznański" (1864-1870) and "Kurier Poznański" (1872-1876), author of 31-volumed "Złota księga szlachty polskiej" (Golden Book of Polish Nobility) and memoirs from January Uprising.

In 1861 he married Joanna Tekla Kietz (1836-1913).
