= Buka =

Buka can refer to:

- Buka, Papua New Guinea, the capital of Autonomous Region of Bougainville
- Buka Rural LLG in Papua New Guinea
- Buka, Pomeranian Voivodeship (north Poland)
- Buka, Uzbekistan (Buká), a town in the Tashkent Province of Uzbekistan
- Buka Island, the second largest island in the Papua New Guinean province of Bougainville
- Buka (music), the opening of a gamelan composition
- Buka cloak, a Noongar Southwest Australian indigenous word describing, usually, a kangaroo-skin cloak worn draped over one shoulder.
