= EYM =

EYM may refer to:

- Eucharistic Youth Movement, an international Catholic educational movement oriented to youth
- Eurovision Young Musicians, a biennial classical music competition for European musicians aged 12 to 21
