= Kostrzyca =

Kostrzyca may refer to the following places in Poland:

- Kostrzyca, Lower Silesian Voivodeship (south-west Poland)
- Kostrzyca, Pomeranian Voivodeship (north Poland)
