= Poręba (disambiguation) =

Poręba is a town in Silesian Voivodeship, south Poland.

Poręba may also refer to:

- Poręba, Pszczyna County in Silesian Voivodeship (south Poland)
- Poręba, Greater Poland Voivodeship (west-central Poland)
- Poręba, Lesser Poland Voivodeship (south Poland)
- Poręba, Łódź Voivodeship (central Poland)
- Poręba, Lower Silesian Voivodeship (south-west Poland)
- Poręba, Masovian Voivodeship (east-central Poland)
- Poręba, Świętokrzyskie Voivodeship (south-central Poland)
- Poręba, Lubusz Voivodeship (west Poland)
- Poręba, Gmina Leśnica in Opole Voivodeship (south-west Poland)
- Poręba, Pomeranian Voivodeship (north Poland)
- Polish name for Poruba (Orlová), a former village now part of Orlová, Czech Republic

Poręba as a surname:

- Bohdan Poręba (1934–2014), film and theatre director
- David Poreba (born 2002), American soccer player
- Łukasz Poręba (born 2000), Polish footballer
- Mateusz Poręba (born 1999), Polish volleyball player
- Patryk Poręba (born 1992), Polish luger
- Tomasz Poręba (born 1973), Polish politician
