= Łęki, Myślenice County =

Łęki
- Village
- Location within Poland
- Coordinates: 49°49′44″N 20°1′17″E
- Country: Poland
- Voivodeship: Lesser Poland
- County: Myślenice
- Gmina: Myślenice
- Population: 966

Łęki [ˈwɛŋkʲi] is a village in the administrative district of Gmina Myślenice, within Myślenice County, Lesser Poland Voivodeship, in southern Poland.
