= Borzęta =

- Village
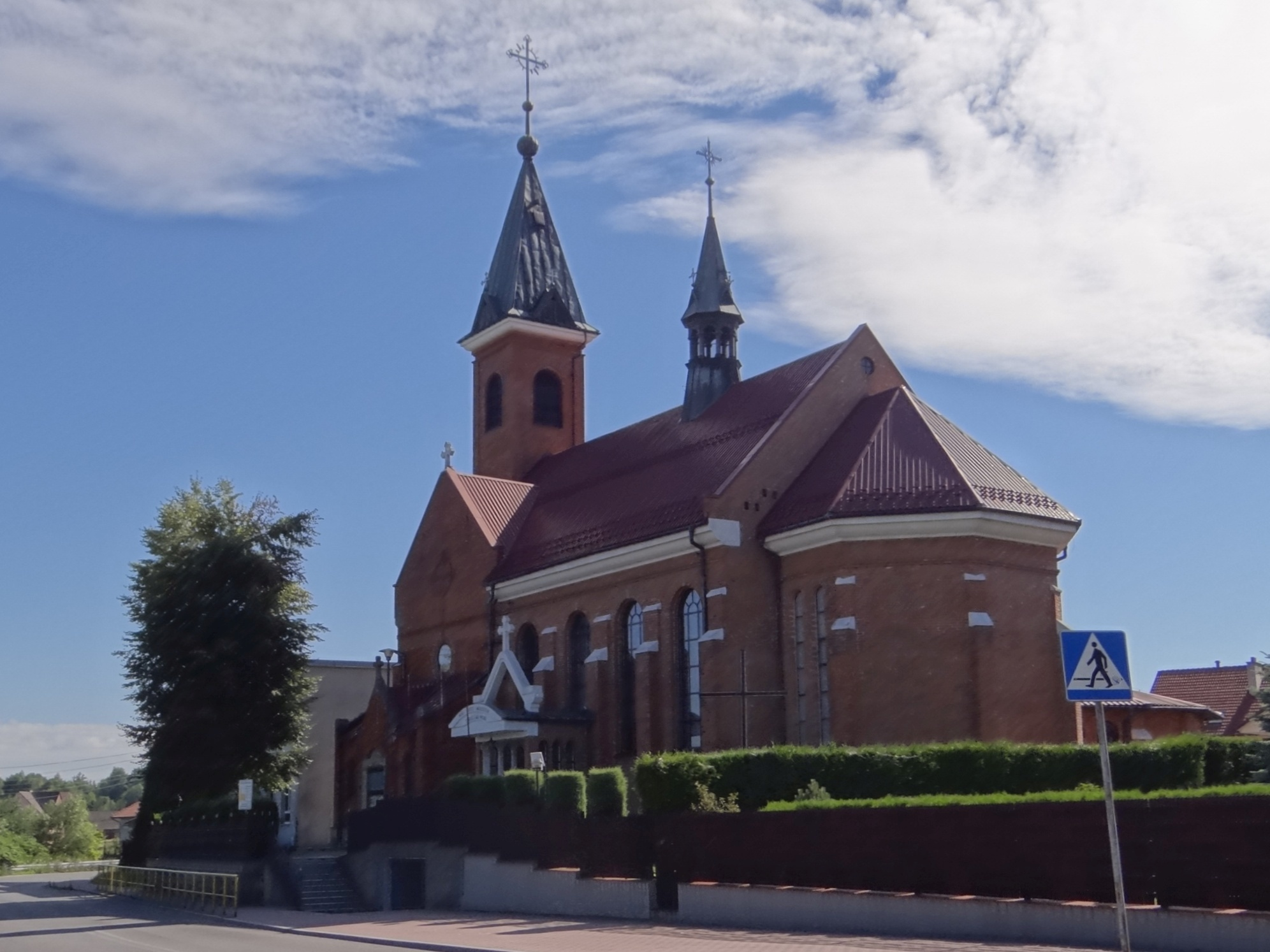
- Catholic church

- Location within Poland
- Coordinates: 49°52′N 19°59′E
- Country: Poland
- Voivodeship: Lesser Poland
- County: Myślenice
- Gmina: Myślenice

Borzęta [bɔˈʐɛnta] is a village in the administrative district of Gmina Myślenice, within Myślenice County, Lesser Poland Voivodeship, in southern Poland.
