= Zasań =

- Village
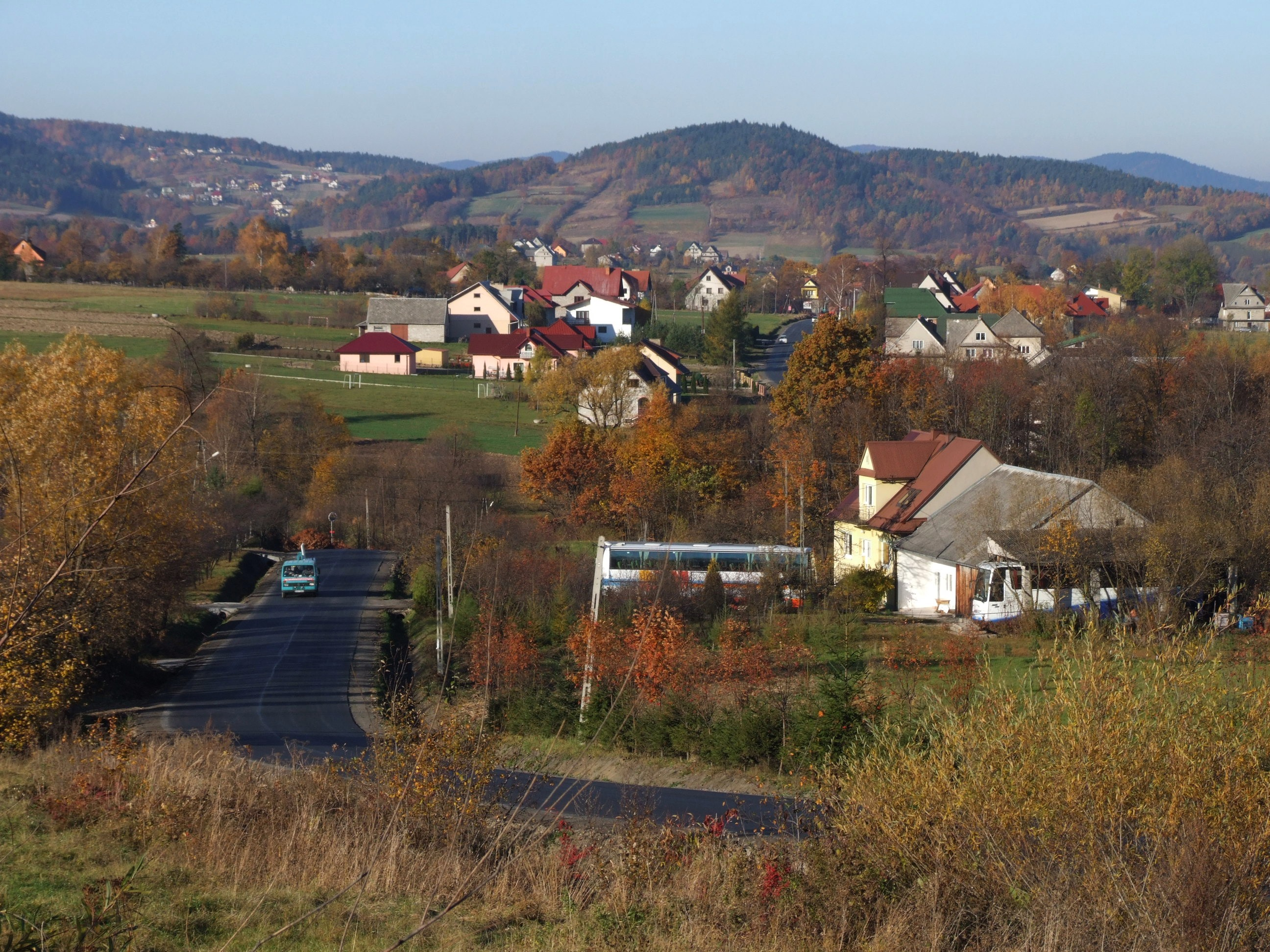

- Location within Poland
- Coordinates: 49°50′N 20°4′E
- Country: Poland
- Voivodeship: Lesser Poland
- County: Myślenice
- Gmina: Myślenice
- Population: 720

Zasań [ˈzasaɲ] is a village in the administrative district of Gmina Myślenice, within Myślenice County, Lesser Poland Voivodeship, in southern Poland.
