= Cierznie =

- Village
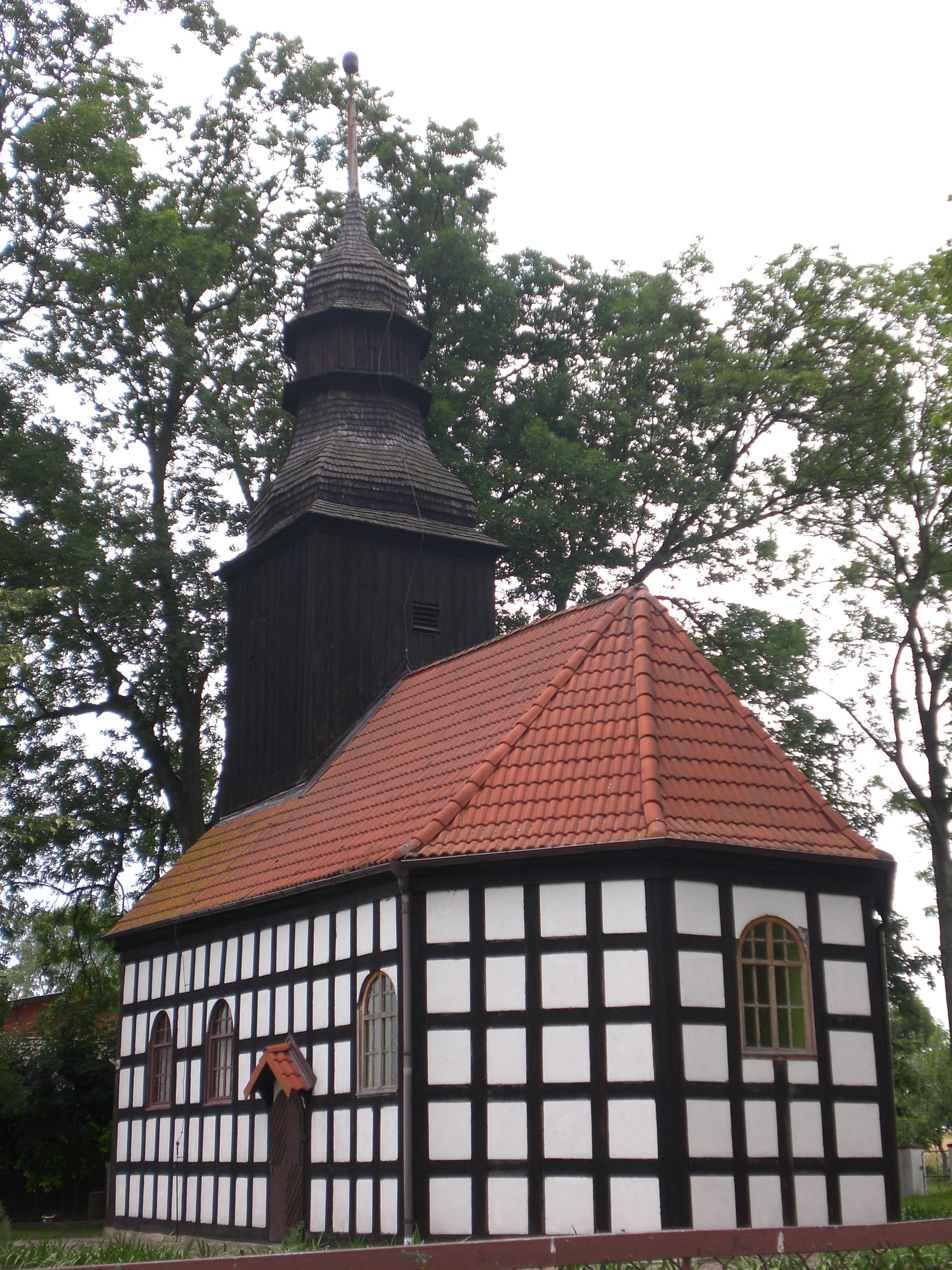
- Saints Peter and Paul church in Cierznie

- Location within Poland
- Coordinates: 53°34′19″N 17°4′19″E
- Country: Poland
- Voivodeship: Pomeranian
- County: Człuchów
- Gmina: Debrzno
- Population: 215
- Time zone: UTC+1 (CET)
  - Summer (DST): UTC+2 (CEST)
- Vehicle registration: GCZ

Cierznie [ˈt͡ɕɛʐɲɛ] is a village in the administrative district of Gmina Debrzno, within Człuchów County, Pomeranian Voivodeship, in northern Poland. It is located within the historic region of Pomerania.

Cierznie was a royal village of the Polish Crown, administratively located in the Człuchów County in the Pomeranian Voivodeship.
