= Gmina Debrzno =

Gmina Debrzno Debrzno Commune
- Gmina
- Flag Coat of arms
- Interactive map of Gmina Debrzno
- Coordinates (Debrzno): 53°32′N 17°14′E
- Country: Poland
- Voivodeship: Pomeranian
- County: Człuchów
- Seat: Debrzno

Area
  - Total: 224.17 km^{2} (86.55 sq mi)

Population (2006)
  - Total: 9,403
  - Density: 41.95/km^{2} (108.6/sq mi)
  - Urban: 5,359
  - Rural: 4,044
- Website: http://debrzno.pl/

Gmina Debrzno is an urban-rural gmina (administrative district) in Człuchów County, Pomeranian Voivodeship, in northern Poland. Its seat is the town of Debrzno, which lies approximately 16 kilometres (10 mi) south-west of Człuchów and 131 km (81 mi) south-west of the regional capital Gdańsk.

The gmina covers an area of 224.17 square kilometres (86.6 sq mi), and as of 2006 its total population is 9,403 (out of which the population of Debrzno amounts to 5,359, and the population of the rural part of the gmina is 4,044).

== Villages ==
Apart from the town of Debrzno, Gmina Debrzno contains the villages and settlements of Boboszewo, Bolesławowo, Buchowo, Buka, Buszkowo, Cierznie, Drozdowo, Główna, Gniewno, Grzymisław, Kamień, Kostrzyca, Miłachowo, Myśligoszcz, Nierybie, Nowe Gronowo, Ostrza, Pędziszewo, Pokrzywy, Poręba, Prusinowo, Przypólsko, Rozdoły, Rozwory, Skowarnki, Słupia, Służewo, Smug, Stanisławka, Stare Gronowo, Strzeczona, Strzeczonka, Strzeszyn, Uniechów and Uniechówek.

== Neighbouring gminas ==
Gmina Debrzno is bordered by the gminas of Czarne, Człuchów, Kamień Krajeński, Lipka, Okonek and Sępólno Krajeńskie.
