= Miłachowo, Pomeranian Voivodeship =

Miłachowo
- Settlement
- Location within Poland
- Coordinates: 53°32′35″N 17°12′21″E
- Country: Poland
- Voivodeship: Pomeranian
- County: Człuchów
- Gmina: Debrzno

Miłachowo [miwaˈxɔvɔ] is a settlement in the administrative district of Gmina Debrzno, within Człuchów County, Pomeranian Voivodeship, in northern Poland.

For details of the history of the region, see History of Pomerania.
