= Eucharistic Crusade =

Catholic youth movement devoted to the Eucharist

- Croisade Eucharistique
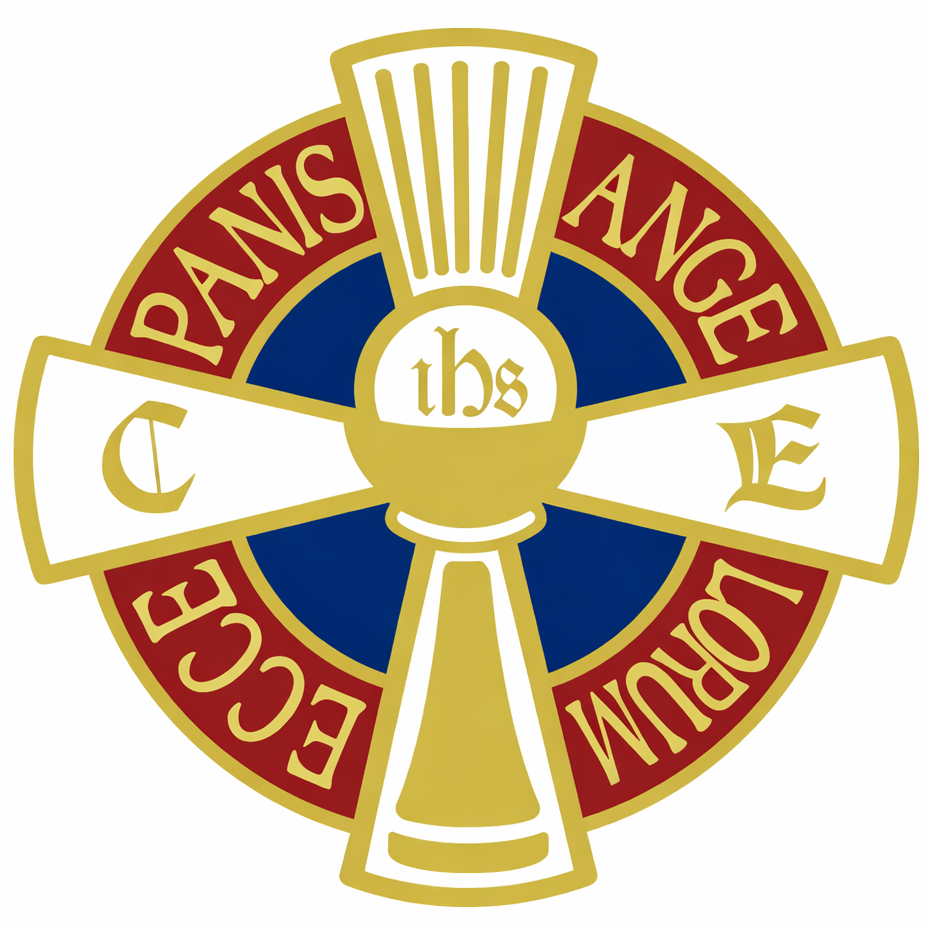
- Abbreviation: EUC
- Successor: Eucharistic Youth Movement (renamed and reorganised in many regions in the early 1960s)
- Formation: November 13, 1914; 111 years ago
- Founder: Revd Edouard Poppe; Revd Albert Bessières SJ
- Founded at: Bordeaux, France
- Dissolved: Renamed and restructured during the early 1960s
- Type: Catholic youth movement
- Origins: Catholic devotional renewal following Quam singulari
- Region served: International
- Official language: Various
- Parent organization: Society of Saint Pius X (SSPX) (revival in the 1980s)
- Remarks: Revived within the SSPX in the 1980s as a restoration of the original statutes and mission
Eucharistic Crusade
- General style of attire customarily worn by members in the Netherlands (ordinary variations being here omitted)

The Eucharistic Crusade (EUC; French: Croisade Eucharistique, CE) is a Catholic youth movement devoted to cultivating in children and young people a reverent and affectionate devotion to the Eucharist. Founded in the early twentieth century, it became firmly established throughout Europe and beyond, and is recognised as the predecessor of the Eucharistic Youth Movement (EYM). In sundry Catholic communities, including the Society of Saint Pius X (SSPX), the EUC continues as a renewal and preservation of the original movement rather than as a distinct and separate foundation.

== Origins and early development ==
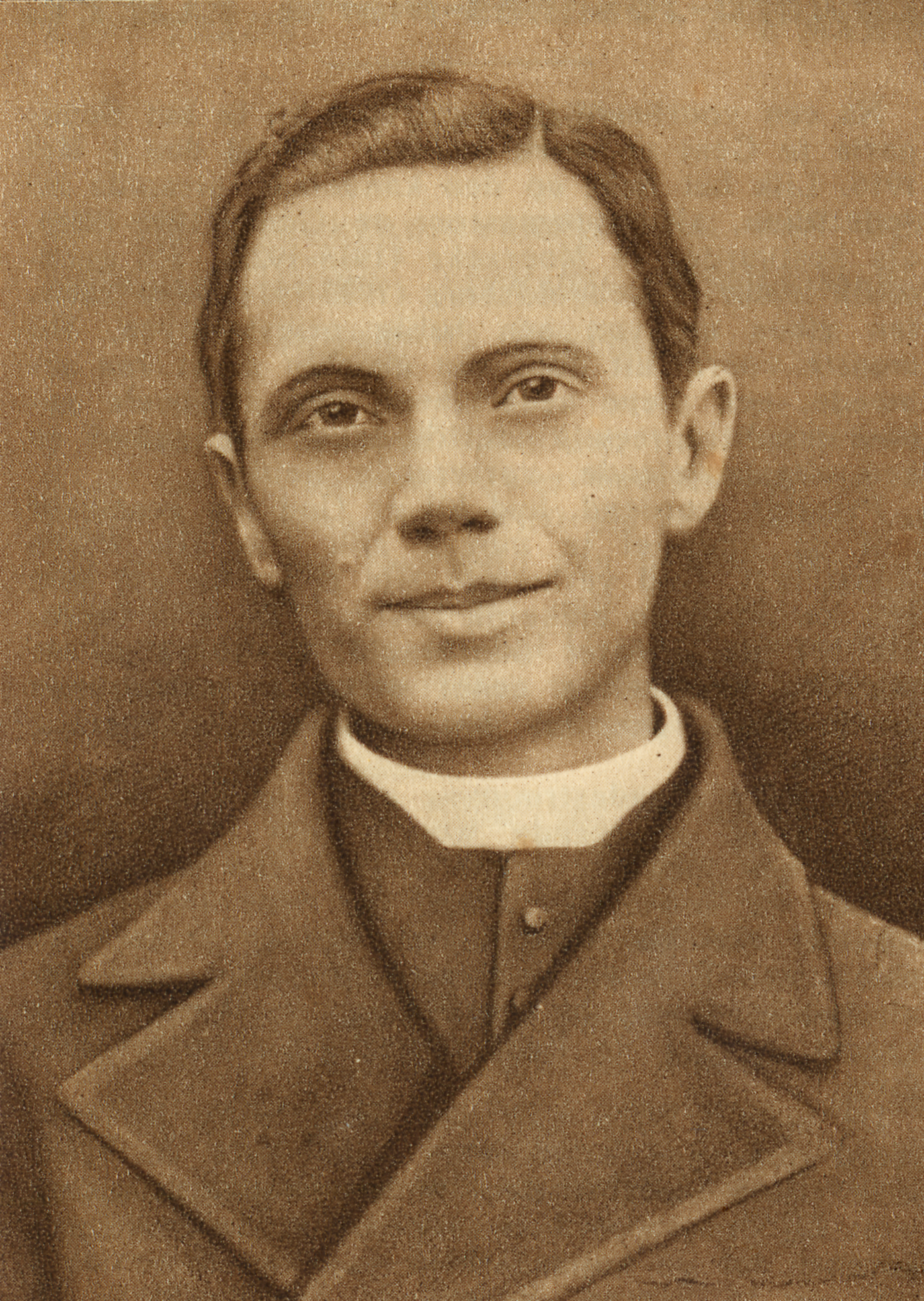
Portrait of Revd Edouard Poppe from a Dutch prayer card

The EUC traces its roots in the 1910 decree Quam singulari of Pope Pius X, which encouraged the early reception of Holy Communion by children and called the faithful to renewed fervour in Eucharistic devotion. In 1914, at the outbreak of the First World War, children in Bordeaux began offering prayers and sacrifices for the soldiers and for the restoration of peace. From these beginnings there arose a more orderly and deliberate apostolate for youth. Revds Edouard (or Edward) Poppe and Albert Bessières SJ are commonly credited with formally organising the Eucharistic Crusade on 13 November 1914, and in the years that followed the movement received papal approval.

The movement spread swiftly through France, Belgium, Switzerland, Italy, Spain and further abroad. It set before children a programme at once simple and exacting, viz. "pray, receive communion, make sacrifices, be an apostle". Members were wont to progress through ranks known as page, crusader, and knight or handmaid. These successive stages reflect growth in responsibility and devotion.

== Transition and renaming in the mid-twentieth century ==
In the decades following the Second World War, and particularly during the period surrounding the Second Vatican Council, a considerable number of Catholic youth movements were subjected to revision in language, internal arrangement and pastoral orientation. Within this broader context, the Eucharistic Crusade was progressively reformed in several countries. The terminology of Crusade, together with the more martial nomenclature of its ranks and certain devotional accents long associated with the same, was set aside or recast in favour of forms deemed more agreeable to the temper and habits of contemporary youth culture.

During the early 1960s the movement was reorganised and gradually renamed the Eucharistic Youth Movement (EYM). This change was attended by a reordering of formation methods and a renewed emphasis on social engagement and global prayer intentions under the direction of what in later years came to be styled the Pope’s Worldwide Prayer Network.

== Revival within the Society of Saint Pius X ==
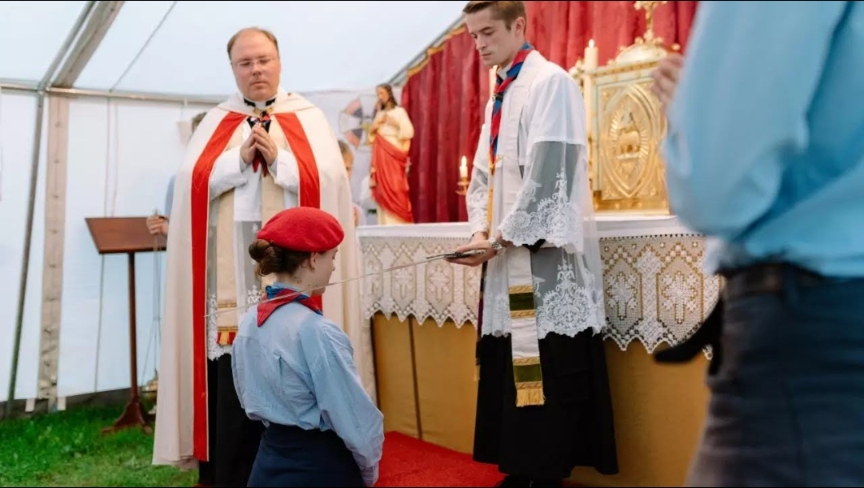
Investiture of a teenage girl into the SSPX EUC, the ceremony taking place at Gerwen, Netherlands

Since the 1980s, the Eucharistic Crusade has been diligently promoted within the Society of Saint Pius X (SSPX). Toward the conclusion of that decade, certain clergy associated with the Society undertook the restoration of the movement in conformity with its earlier statutes, terminology, and devotional observances, with a deliberate intention of recalling it to its former discipline and character. This was presented as a revival and orderly continuation of the original Eucharistic Crusade rather than the establishment of a new organisation.

SSPX publications present this revival as an effort to preserve intact the original spirit and purpose of the Crusade. Such preservation includes its explicit and unwavering Eucharistic orientation, and its firm insistence upon prayer, sacrifice and apostolate. Within the Society's districts throughout Europe, North America, Asia and elsewhere, the EUC convenes meetings, provides catechetical instruction, and arranges camps and pilgrimages. Its members bind themselves to the daily recitation of prayer, the offering of sacrifices for monthly intentions, faithful attendance at Mass and the steady cultivation of Christian virtue within daily life.

== Attire and membership practices ==
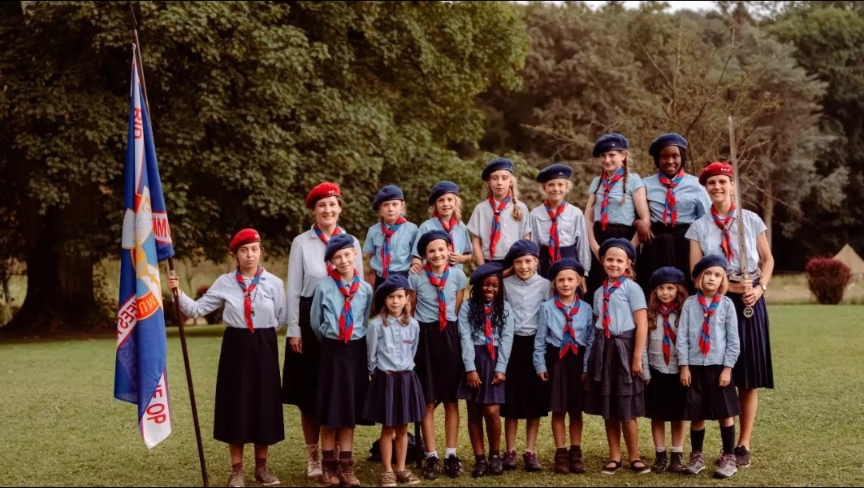
General style of attire worn by EUC members in the Netherlands

Within the SSPX, the EUC maintains distinctive uniform, attire and accessories, the particular form whereof vary according to country and chapter. Each usage reflects local custom and habit, whilst preserving the same recognisable spirit of belonging to the EUC.

In the Netherlands, members are commonly distinguished by a scout-style scarf (neckerchief) composed of red and blue. The arrangement thereof may be either red without and blue within, or blue without and red within. The scarf is fastened by means of an EUC woggle and is worn together with a red or navy blue beret. In Belgium, a white scarf with navy blue lining is susbtituted. In France, the United States, the Philippines, Ireland, and certain Commonwealth realms, a plain or crusader tunic constitutes part of the appointed attire.

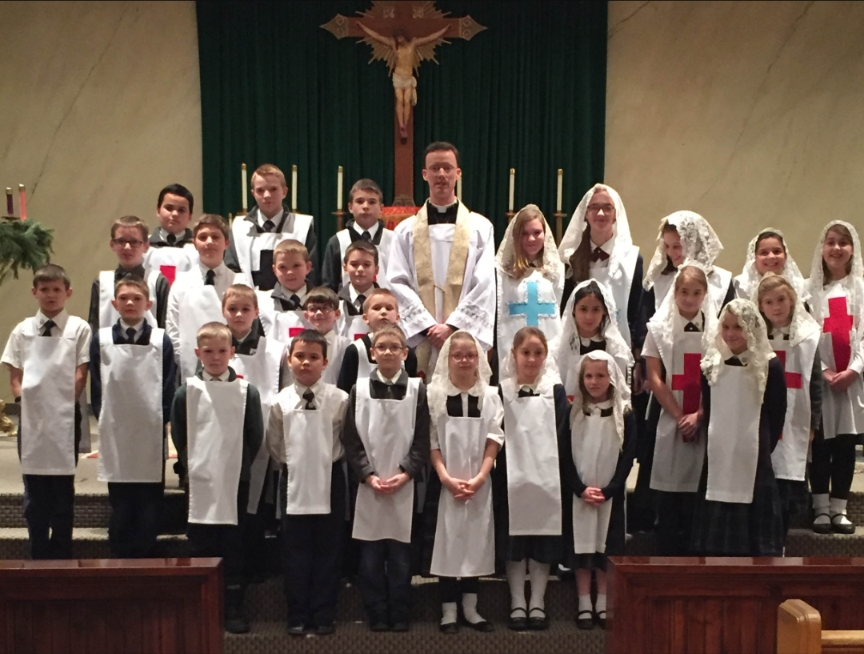
General style of attire worn by EUC members in the United States

Where a scarf is worn in conjunction with a shirt, it may be arranged either over the collar, the collar being turned in, or beneath the collar.

Members residing in countries without an established EUC chapter, or who take part without belonging to a particular national branch, are permitted adopt the attire style of one recognised chapter. They are bound to choose one chapter pattern and adhere thereto consistently. The combining of elements drawn from several chapters within the same dress is not sanctioned. Those persons who are permitted to wear the EUC attire or accessories despite not being enrolled as ordinary members are subject to the self-same provision.

== Spirituality ==
The spirituality of the EUC is grounded in a filial devotion to the Blessed Sacrament and the sanctification of daily duties. Members are encouraged to unite their prayers and voluntary sacrifices with the Sacrifice of the Mass, to receive Holy Communion frequently and reverently, and to comport themselves as apostles among their companions. Its declared object is the formation, from the earliest years, of disciplined, generous and devout Catholics.

== See also ==
- Eucharistic Youth Movement
- Pope's Worldwide Prayer Network
- Society of Saint Pius X
