= Bulina, Lesser Poland Voivodeship =

Bulina
- Village
- Location within Poland
- Coordinates: 49°49′13″N 19°59′57″E
- Country: Poland
- Voivodeship: Lesser Poland
- County: Myślenice
- Gmina: Myślenice

Bulina [buˈlina] is a village in the administrative district of Gmina Myślenice, within Myślenice County, Lesser Poland Voivodeship, in southern Poland.
