= Morning offering =

Catholic prayer at the start of the day

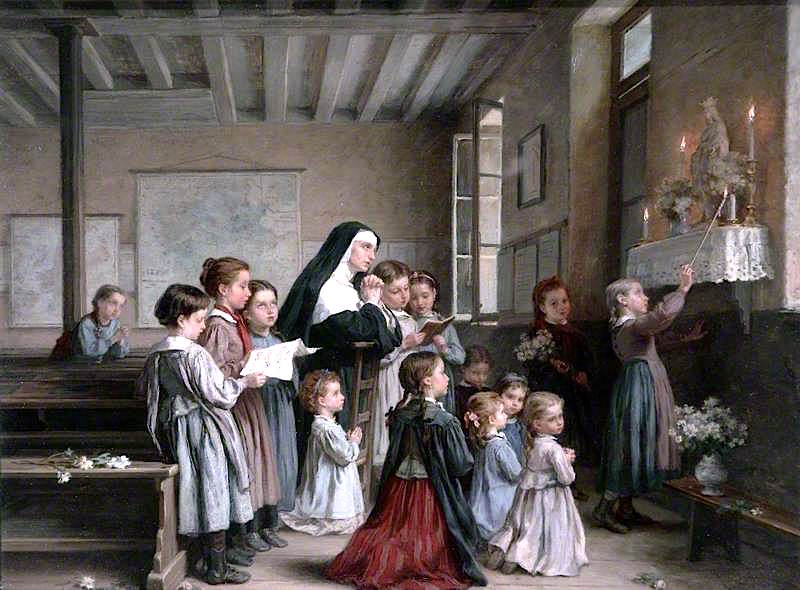
La Prière du Matin (Morning prayer) by André-Henri Dargelas

In Catholicism, the morning offering is a prayer said by an individual at the start of the day in order to consecrate oneself to Jesus Christ. The practice has traditionally been associated with the Apostleship of Prayer. While since 1929 the Pope has added a general and a mission intention to the traditional morning offering prayer each month, Pope Francis has restored this to the original, single monthly intention. Over time other forms of the morning offering prayer have been suggested.

== History and theological basis ==
The morning offering has been an old practice in the Church but it started to spread largely through the Apostleship of Prayer, started by Fr. Francis X. Gautrelet, S.J., and especially through the book written by another Jesuit, Fr. Henri Ramière, S.J., who in 1861 adapted the Apostleship of Prayer for parishes and various Catholic institutions, and made it known by his book "The Apostleship of Prayer" which has been translated into many languages.

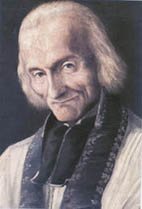
John Marie Vianney

Historic roots of such a practice can be traced to those like Saint Mechtilde (1241-1298) who had visions of Jesus Christ and transmitted the following words of Jesus:

When you awake in the morning, let your first act be to salute My Heart, and to offer Me your own. ...Whoever shall breathe a sigh toward Me from the bottom of his heart when he awakes in the morning and shall ask Me to work all his works in him throughout the day, will draw Me to him. ...For never does a man breathe a sigh of longing aspiration toward Me without drawing Me nearer to him than I was before.

Saint John Mary Vianney has also said: "All that we do without offering it to God is wasted." Catholic authors encourage repeating this offering throughout the day, especially at the start of one's professional work which takes a large part of each day.

The Catechism of the Catholic Church states:

The Christian begins his day, his prayers, and his activities with the Sign of the Cross: "in the name of the Father and of the Son and of the Holy Spirit. Amen." The baptized person dedicates the day to the glory of God and calls on the Savior's grace which lets him act in the Spirit as a child of the Father.

The other element in this theology is the actual work done with spirit of excellence in consonance with the intention of offering something "worthy" to the sanctity, majesty, and goodness of our God.

This theology is also supported by private revelation. Sister Josefa Menéndez (1890-1923) reported that she heard Jesus Christ tell her: "When you awake, enter at once into My Heart, and when you are in it, offer My Father all your actions united to the pulsations of My Heart. ...If [a person is] engaged in work of no value in itself, if she bathes it in My Blood or unites it to the work I Myself did during My mortal life, it will greatly profit souls, ... more, perhaps, than if she had preached to the whole world."

== Practice ==
The Morning offering is meant to be prayed first thing in the morning, upon waking up. In its simplest form, a morning offering is nothing more than a brief prayer that recognizes the presence of God, and puts the day ahead in God's hands. Many forms of this offering are proposed on the website of the Apostleship of Prayer.

The traditional Morning offering to the Sacred Heart of Jesus was composed by French Jesuit Fr. François-Xavier Gautrelet in 1844. It reflects the Alliance of the Hearts of Jesus and Mary.

Traditional Morning Offering

O Jesus, through the Immaculate Heart of Mary, I offer you my prayers, works, joys, sufferings of this day, in union with the Holy Sacrifice of the Mass throughout the world. I offer them for all the intentions of your Sacred Heart; the salvation of souls, the reparation for sin, the reunion of all Christians; I offer them for the intentions of our bishops and of all members of the Apostleship of Prayer, and in particular for the intention recommended by the Holy Father this month.

Children's daily offering prayer

For love of me you came to earth; you gave your life for me. So every day you give me now. I give back happily. Take all my laughter, all my tears, each thought, each word, each deed. And let them be my all-day prayer, to help all those in need.

St. Mechtilde revelation, with two other mystics

Dear Lord, I adore Thy Sacred Heart, which I desire to enter with acts of love, praise, adoration, and thanksgiving. I offer Thee my own heart as I sigh to Thee from its very depths, asking that Thou will worketh through me in all that I do this day; thus may I draw Thee closer to me than Thou wert before. I offer Thee all the crosses and sufferings of the world, in union with Thy life on earth, in expiation for sins. Please join my every action and heartbeat to the pulsations of Thy Heart. I unite all my works of this day to those labors Thou didst perform while Thou wert on earth, bathing them in Thy Precious Blood, and I offer them to the Heavenly Father so that many souls may be saved. Amen.
