= Trzemeśnia =

- Village
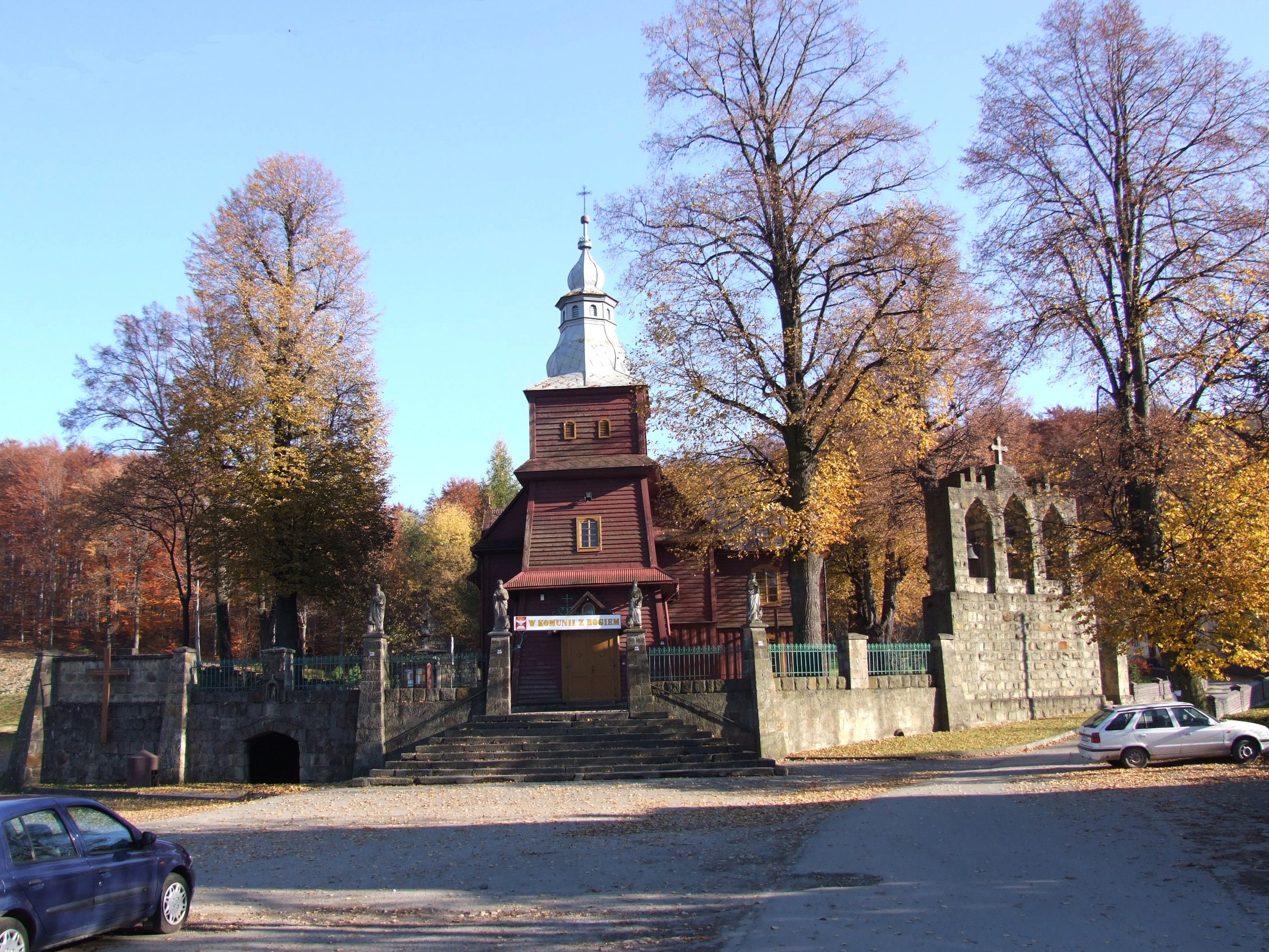
- Old church

- Location within Poland
- Coordinates: 49°44′N 19°59′E
- Country: Poland
- Voivodeship: Lesser Poland
- County: Myślenice
- Gmina: Myślenice
- Population: 2,200

Trzemeśnia [tʂɛˈmɛɕɲa] is a village in the administrative district of Gmina Myślenice, within Myślenice County, Lesser Poland Voivodeship, in southern Poland.
