= Osieczany =

- Village
- Location within Poland
- Coordinates: 49°50′27″N 19°58′45″E
- Country: Poland
- Voivodeship: Lesser Poland
- County: Myślenice
- Gmina: Myślenice

Osieczany [ɔɕɛˈt͡ʂanɨ] is a village in the administrative district of Gmina Myślenice, within Myślenice County, Lesser Poland Voivodeship, in southern Poland.

== History ==
Osieczany was the property of the Kraków Voivode, Teodor. In 1595, the village, located in the Szczyrzyc County of the Kraków Voivodeship, was the property of the Kraków Castellan, Anna Jordanowa, née Sieniawska. In the years 1975–1998, the village administratively belonged to the Kraków Voivodeship.
