= Ostrza =

- Settlement
- Location within Poland
- Coordinates: 53°33′4″N 17°1′12″E
- Country: Poland
- Voivodeship: Pomeranian
- County: Człuchów
- Gmina: Debrzno
- Population: 26

Ostrza [ˈɔstʂa] is a settlement in the administrative district of Gmina Debrzno, within Człuchów County, Pomeranian Voivodeship, in northern Poland.

For details of the history of the region, see History of Pomerania.
