= Polanka, Lesser Poland Voivodeship =

Polanka
- Village
- Location within Poland
- Coordinates: 49°52′N 19°57′E
- Country: Poland
- Voivodeship: Lesser Poland
- County: Myślenice
- Gmina: Myślenice

Polanka [pɔˈlaŋka] is a village in the administrative district of Gmina Myślenice, within Myślenice County, Lesser Poland Voivodeship, in southern Poland.
