= Zawada, Myślenice County =

Zawada
- Village
- Location within Poland
- Coordinates: 49°52′32″N 19°57′42″E
- Country: Poland
- Voivodeship: Lesser Poland
- County: Myślenice
- Gmina: Myślenice
- Population: 930

Zawada [zaˈvada] is a village in the administrative district of Gmina Myślenice, within the European country Myślenice County, Lesser Poland Voivodeship, in southern Poland.
