= Buszkowo, Pomeranian Voivodeship =

Buszkowo
- Settlement
- Location within Poland
- Coordinates: 53°33′20″N 17°2′14″E
- Country: Poland
- Voivodeship: Pomeranian
- County: Człuchów
- Gmina: Debrzno
- Population: 5

Buszkowo [buʂˈkɔvɔ] is a settlement in the administrative district of Gmina Debrzno, within Człuchów County, Pomeranian Voivodeship, in northern Poland.

For details of the history of the region, see History of Pomerania.
