= Prusinowo, Pomeranian Voivodeship =

Prusinowo
- Village
- Location within Poland
- Coordinates: 53°31′57″N 17°3′17″E
- Country: Poland
- Voivodeship: Pomeranian
- County: Człuchów
- Gmina: Debrzno
- Population: 133
- Time zone: UTC+1 (CET)
  - Summer (DST): UTC+2 (CEST)
- Vehicle registration: GCZ

Prusinowo [pruɕiˈnɔvɔ] is a village in the administrative district of Gmina Debrzno, within Człuchów County, Pomeranian Voivodeship, in northern Poland. It is located within the historic region of Pomerania.

Prusinowo was a royal village of the Polish Crown, administratively located in the Człuchów County in the Pomeranian Voivodeship.
