= Gniewno =

- Village
- Location within Poland
- Coordinates: 53°32′35″N 17°9′45″E
- Country: Poland
- Voivodeship: Pomeranian
- County: Człuchów
- Gmina: Debrzno
- Population: 86
- Postal code: 77-310

Gniewno [ˈɡɲɛvnɔ] is a village in the administrative district of Gmina Debrzno, within Człuchów County, Pomeranian Voivodeship, in northern Poland.

For details of the history of the region, see History of Pomerania.
