= Bysina =

- Village
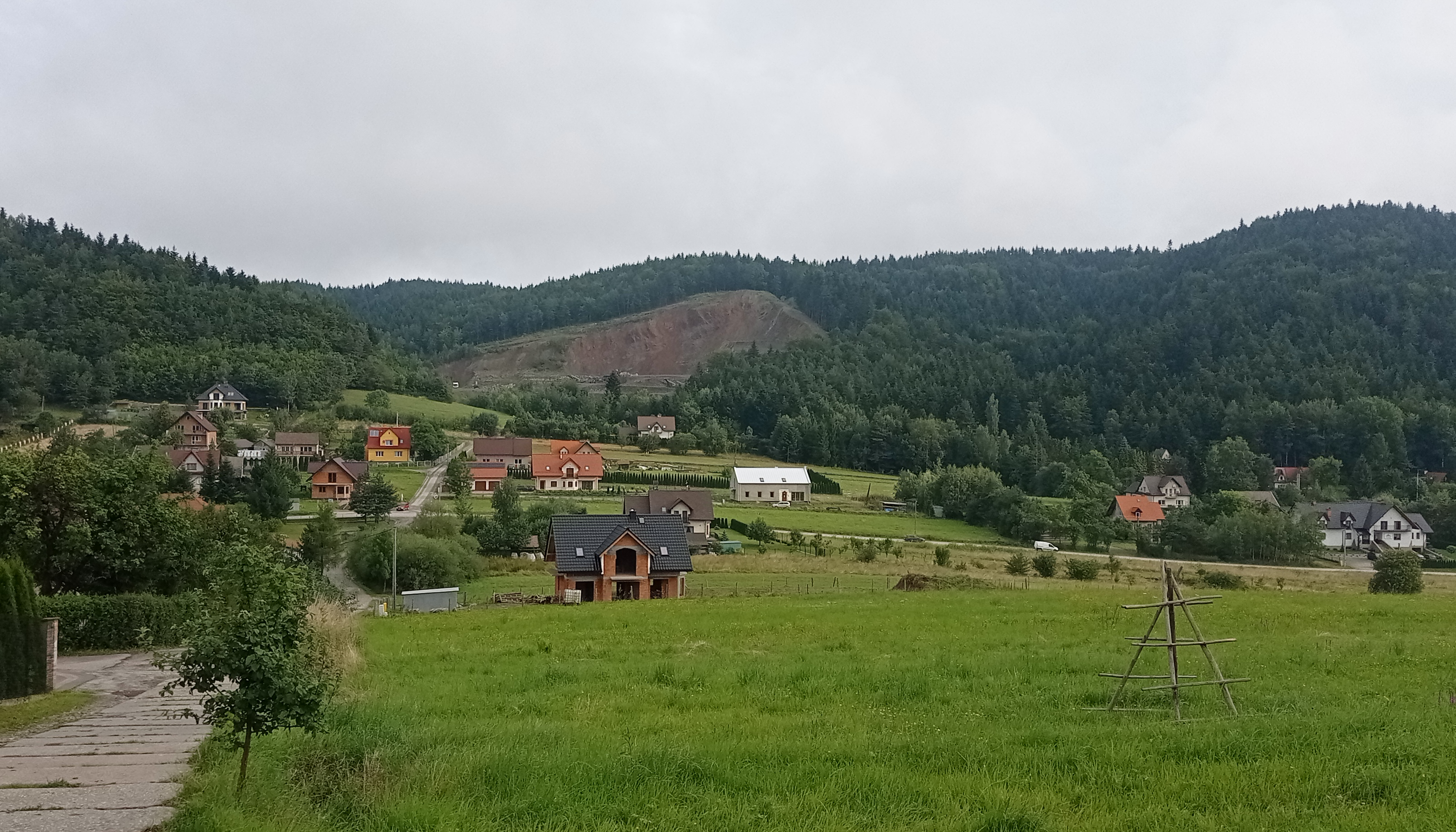
- Bysina, przysiółek Szklary, quarry; on the left: Jasenica

- Location within Poland
- Coordinates: 49°50′N 19°54′E
- Country: Poland
- Voivodeship: Lesser Poland
- County: Myślenice
- Gmina: Myślenice

Bysina [bɨˈɕina] is a village in the administrative district of Gmina Myślenice, within Myślenice County, Lesser Poland Voivodeship, in southern Poland. It is by the rivulet Bysinka.
