= Uniechów =

- Village
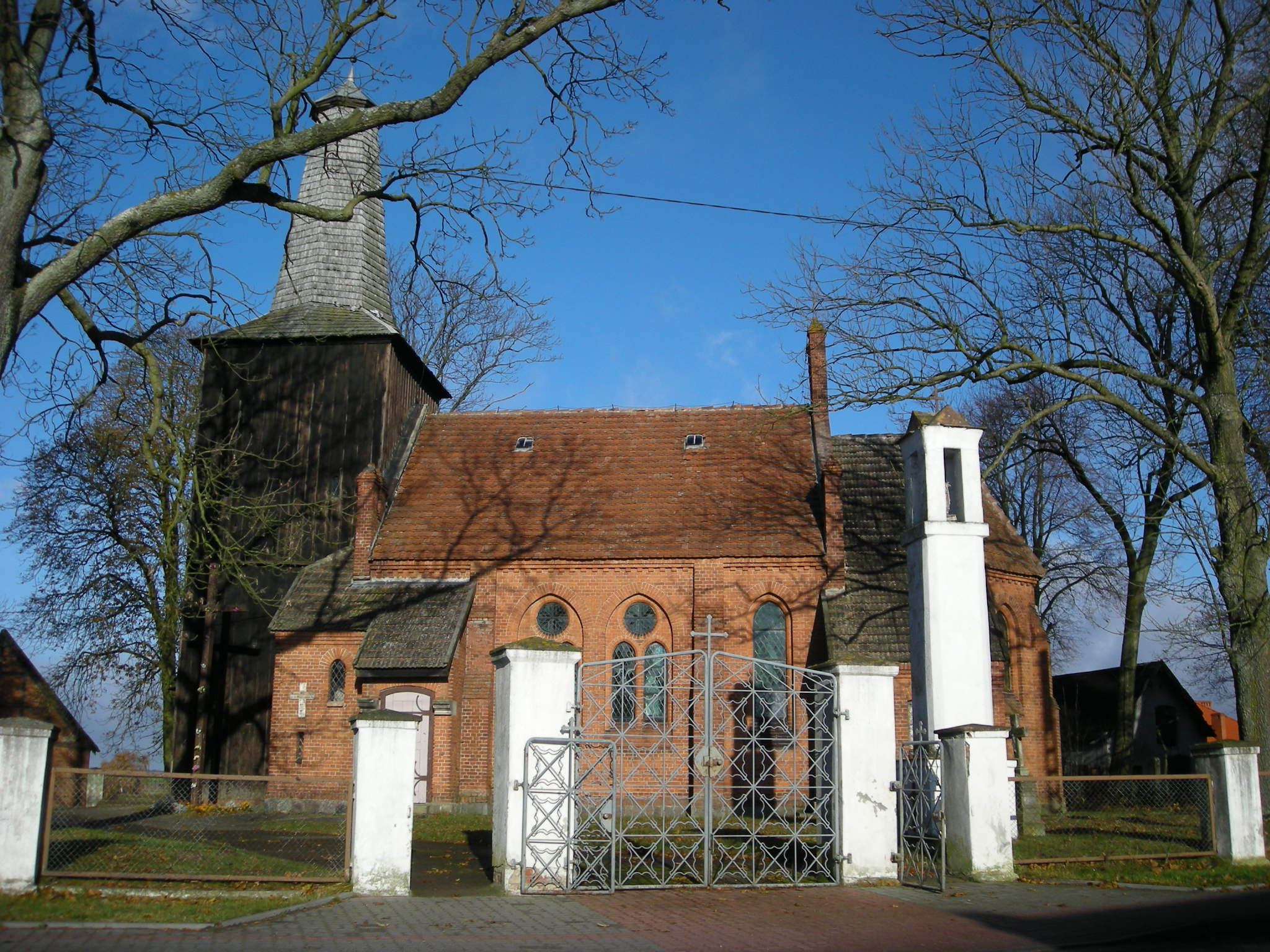
- Church of Saint Bartholomew

- Location within Poland
- Coordinates: 53°35′52″N 17°7′58″E
- Country: Poland
- Voivodeship: Pomeranian
- County: Człuchów
- Gmina: Debrzno

Population
  - Total: 311
- Time zone: UTC+1 (CET)
  - Summer (DST): UTC+2 (CEST)

Uniechów [uˈɲɛxuf] is a village in the administrative district of Gmina Debrzno, within Człuchów County, Pomeranian Voivodeship, in northern Poland. It is located within the historic region of Pomerania.

Uniechów was a royal village of the Polish Crown, administratively located in the Człuchów County in the Pomeranian Voivodeship. During World War II the German Nazi administration operated a labor camp for 60 prisoners of war from the Stalag II-B prisoner-of-war camp in the village.
