= Gmina Myślenice =

Gmina Myślenice Myślenice Commune
- Gmina
- Flag Coat of arms
- Interactive map of Gmina Myślenice
- Coordinates (Myślenice): 49°50′N 19°56′E
- Country: Poland
- Voivodeship: Lesser Poland
- County: Myślenice
- Seat: Myślenice

Area
  - Total: 153.7 km^{2} (59.3 sq mi)

Population (2006)
  - Total: 40,783
  - Density: 265.3/km^{2} (687.2/sq mi)
  - Urban: 18,070
  - Rural: 22,713
- Website: http://www.myslenice.pl/

Gmina Myślenice is an urban-rural gmina (administrative district) in Myślenice County, Lesser Poland Voivodeship, in southern Poland. Its seat is the town of Myślenice, which lies approximately 26 kilometres (16 mi) south of the regional capital Kraków.

The gmina covers an area of 153.7 square kilometres (59.3 sq mi), and as of 2006 its total population is 40,783 (out of which the population of Myślenice amounts to 18,070, and the population of the rural part of the gmina is 22,713).

== Villages ==
Apart from the town of Myślenice, Gmina Myślenice contains the villages and settlements of Bęczarka, Borzęta, Bulina, Bysina, Droginia, Głogoczów, Jasienica, Jawornik, Krzyszkowice, Łęki, Osieczany, Polanka, Poręba, Trzemeśnia, Zasań and Zawada.

== Neighbouring gminas ==
Gmina Myślenice is bordered by the gminas of Dobczyce, Mogilany, Pcim, Siepraw, Skawina, Sułkowice and Wiśniowa.
