= Skowarnki =

- Village
- Location within Poland
- Coordinates: 53°36′2″N 17°4′39″E
- Country: Poland
- Voivodeship: Pomeranian
- County: Człuchów
- Gmina: Debrzno
- Population: 171

Skowarnki [skɔˈvarnki] is a village in the administrative district of Gmina Debrzno, within Człuchów County, Pomeranian Voivodeship, in northern Poland.

== See also ==
- History of Pomerania
