= Jawornik, Lesser Poland Voivodeship =

Jawornik
- Village
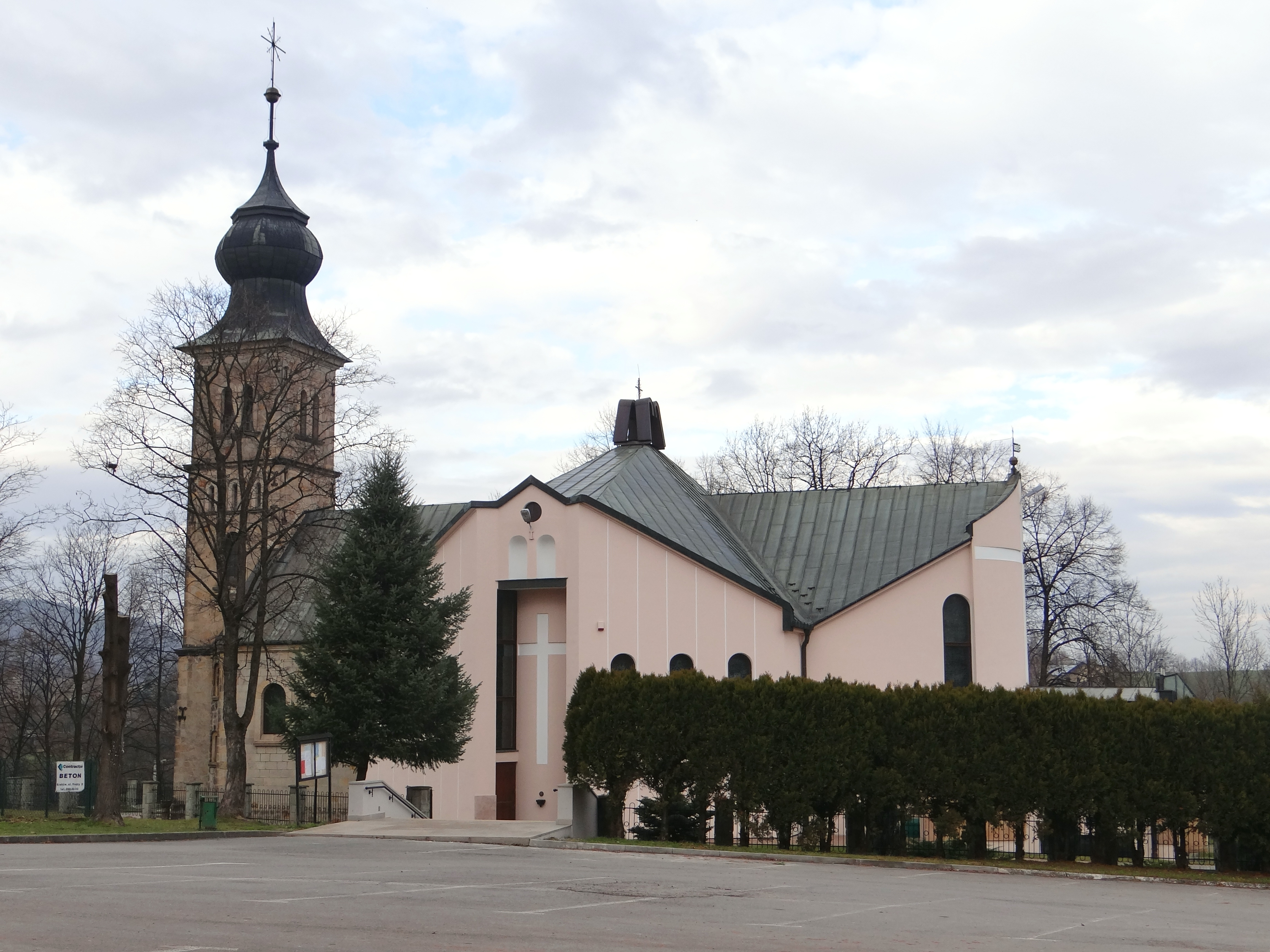
- Catholic church

- Location within Poland
- Coordinates: 49°51′37″N 19°53′42″E
- Country: Poland
- Voivodeship: Lesser Poland
- County: Myślenice
- Gmina: Myślenice
- Population: 2,822

Jawornik [jaˈvɔrɲik] is a village in the administrative district of Gmina Myślenice, within Myślenice County, Lesser Poland Voivodeship, in southern Poland.
