= Słupia, Pomeranian Voivodeship =

Słupia
- Village
- Location within Poland
- Coordinates: 53°35′3″N 17°16′43″E
- Country: Poland
- Voivodeship: Pomeranian
- County: Człuchów
- Gmina: Debrzno
- Population: 421
- Time zone: UTC+1 (CET)
  - Summer (DST): UTC+2 (CEST)
- Vehicle registration: GCZ

Słupia [ˈswupja] is a village in the administrative district of Gmina Debrzno, within Człuchów County, Pomeranian Voivodeship, in northern Poland. It is located within the historic region of Pomerania.

Słupia was a royal village of the Polish Crown, administratively located in the Człuchów County in the Pomeranian Voivodeship.
