= Drozdowo, Człuchów County =

Drozdowo
- Village
- Location within Poland
- Coordinates: 53°31′28″N 17°19′16″E
- Country: Poland
- Voivodeship: Pomeranian
- County: Człuchów
- Gmina: Debrzno
- Population: 59

Drozdowo [drɔzˈdɔvɔ] is a village in the administrative district of Gmina Debrzno, within Człuchów County, Pomeranian Voivodeship, in northern Poland.

For details of the history of the region, see History of Pomerania.
