= Krzyszkowice, Lesser Poland Voivodeship =

Krzyszkowice
- Village
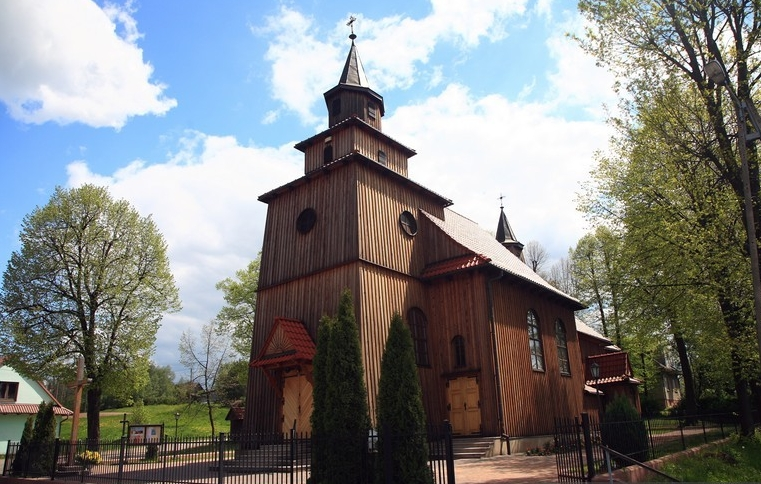
- Church of Saint Anne

- Location within Poland
- Coordinates: 49°53′N 19°56′E
- Country: Poland
- Voivodeship: Lesser Poland
- County: Myślenice
- Gmina: Myślenice

Krzyszkowice [kʂɨʂkɔˈvit͡sɛ] is a village in the administrative district of Gmina Myślenice, within Myślenice County, Lesser Poland Voivodeship, in southern Poland.
