= Bęczarka =

- Village
- Location within Poland
- Coordinates: 49°53′N 19°52′E
- Country: Poland
- Voivodeship: Lesser Poland
- County: Myślenice
- Gmina: Myślenice
- Website: http://www.beczarka.pl/

Bęczarka [bɛnˈt͡ʂarka] is a village in the administrative district of Gmina Myślenice, within Myślenice County, Lesser Poland Voivodeship, in southern Poland.
