= Poręba, Lesser Poland Voivodeship =

Poręba
- Village
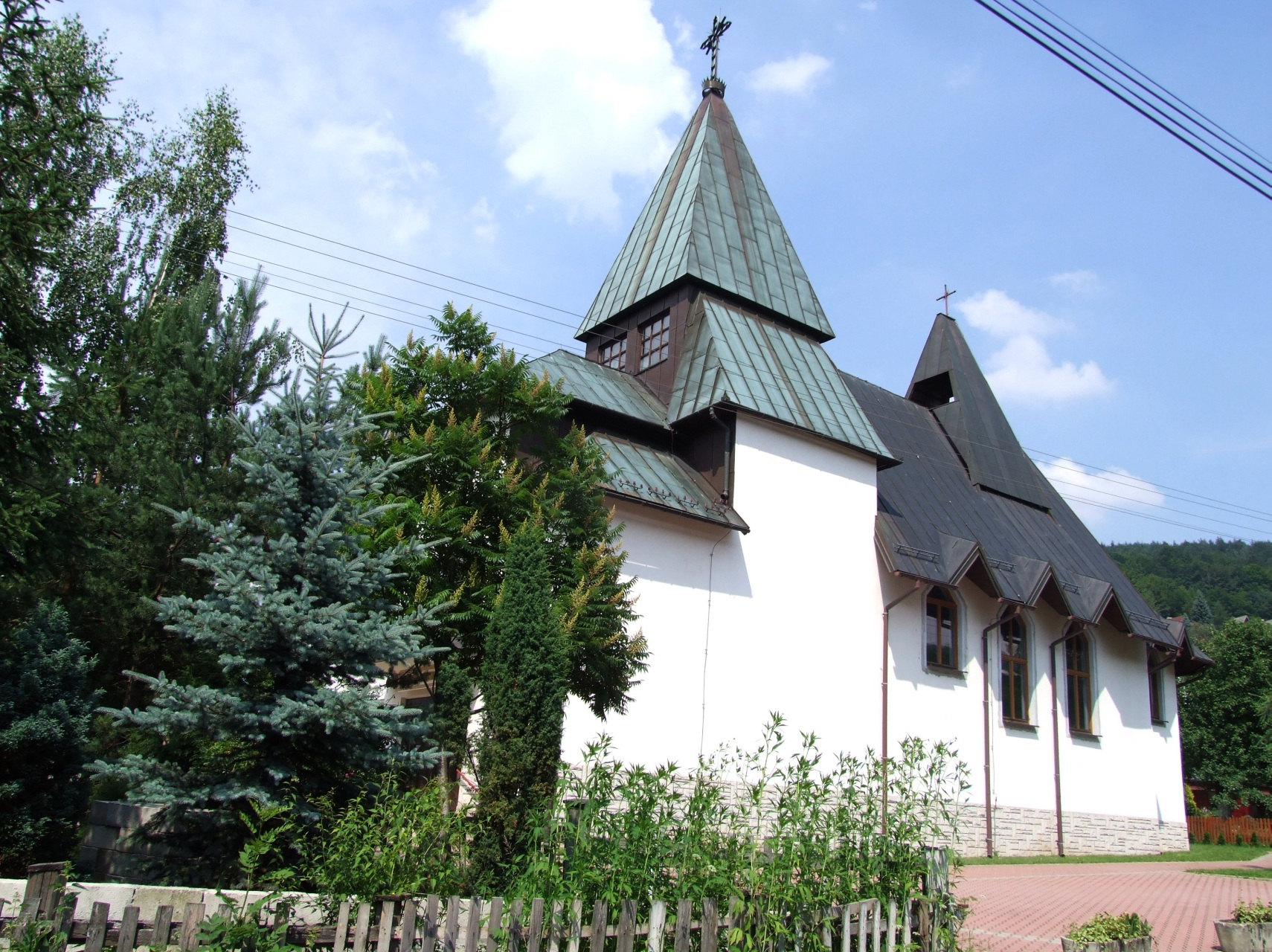
- Catholic church

- Location within Poland
- Coordinates: 49°47′48″N 20°1′4″E
- Country: Poland
- Voivodeship: Lesser Poland
- County: Myślenice
- Gmina: Myślenice
- Population: 1,178

Poręba [pɔˈrɛmba] is a village in the administrative district of Gmina Myślenice, within Myślenice County, Lesser Poland Voivodeship, in southern Poland.
