= Smugi =

Smugi may refer to the following places:

- Smugi, Łódź Voivodeship (central Poland)
- Smugi, Lublin Voivodeship (east Poland)
- Smugi, Świętokrzyskie Voivodeship (south-central Poland)
- Smugi, Greater Poland Voivodeship (west-central Poland)
- Smugi, Drawsko County in West Pomeranian Voivodeship (north-west Poland)
- Smugi, Koszalin County in West Pomeranian Voivodeship (north-west Poland)
