= Smug, Poland =

Smug
- Settlement

- Location within Poland
- Coordinates: 53°33′18″N 17°15′40″E
- Country: Poland
- Voivodeship: Pomeranian
- County: Człuchów
- Gmina: Debrzno
- Population: 21

Smug [smuk] is a settlement in the administrative district of Gmina Debrzno, within Człuchów County, Pomeranian Voivodeship, in northern Poland.

For details of the history of the region, see History of Pomerania.
