= Ruská Poruba =

- Municipality
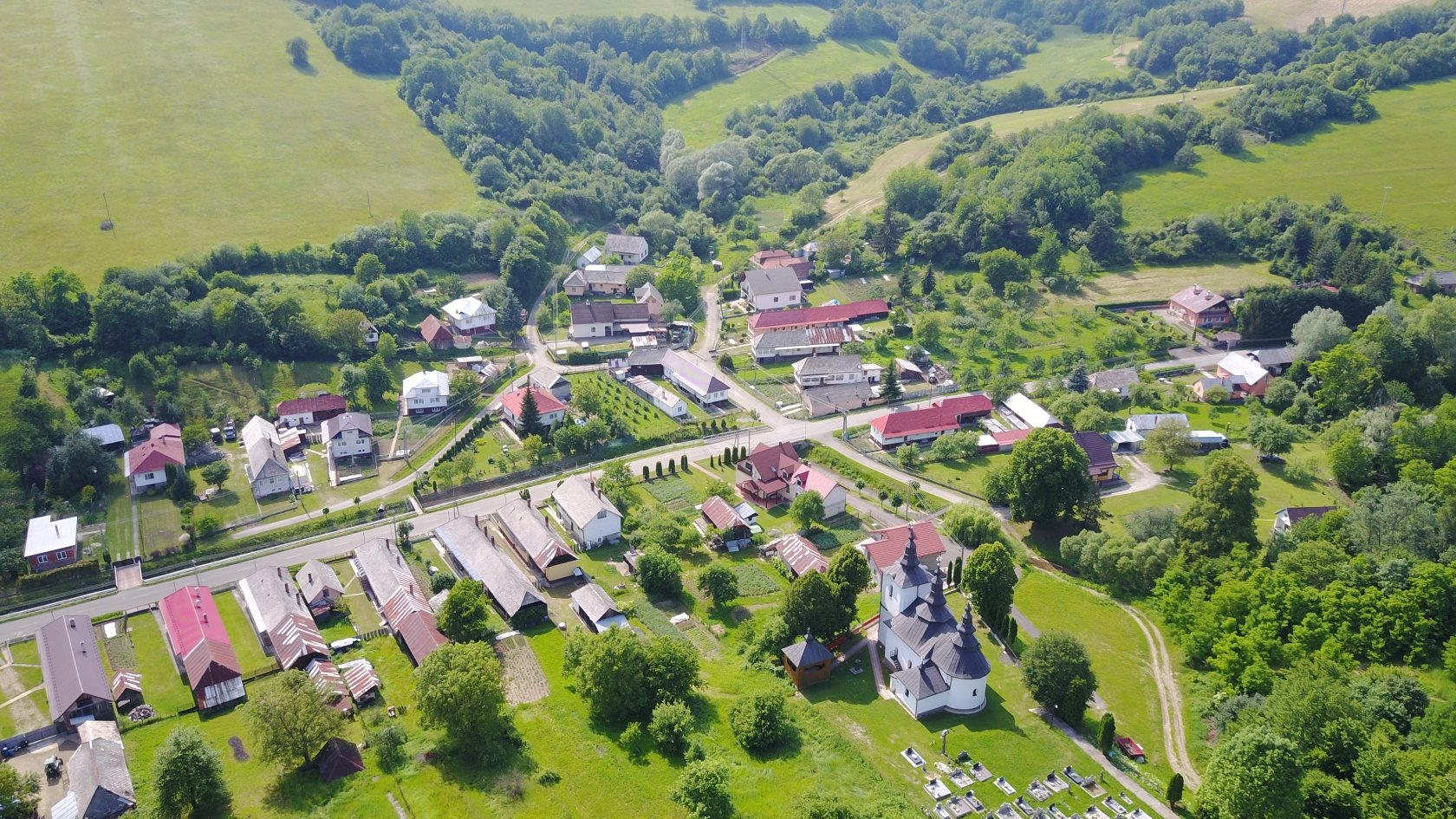

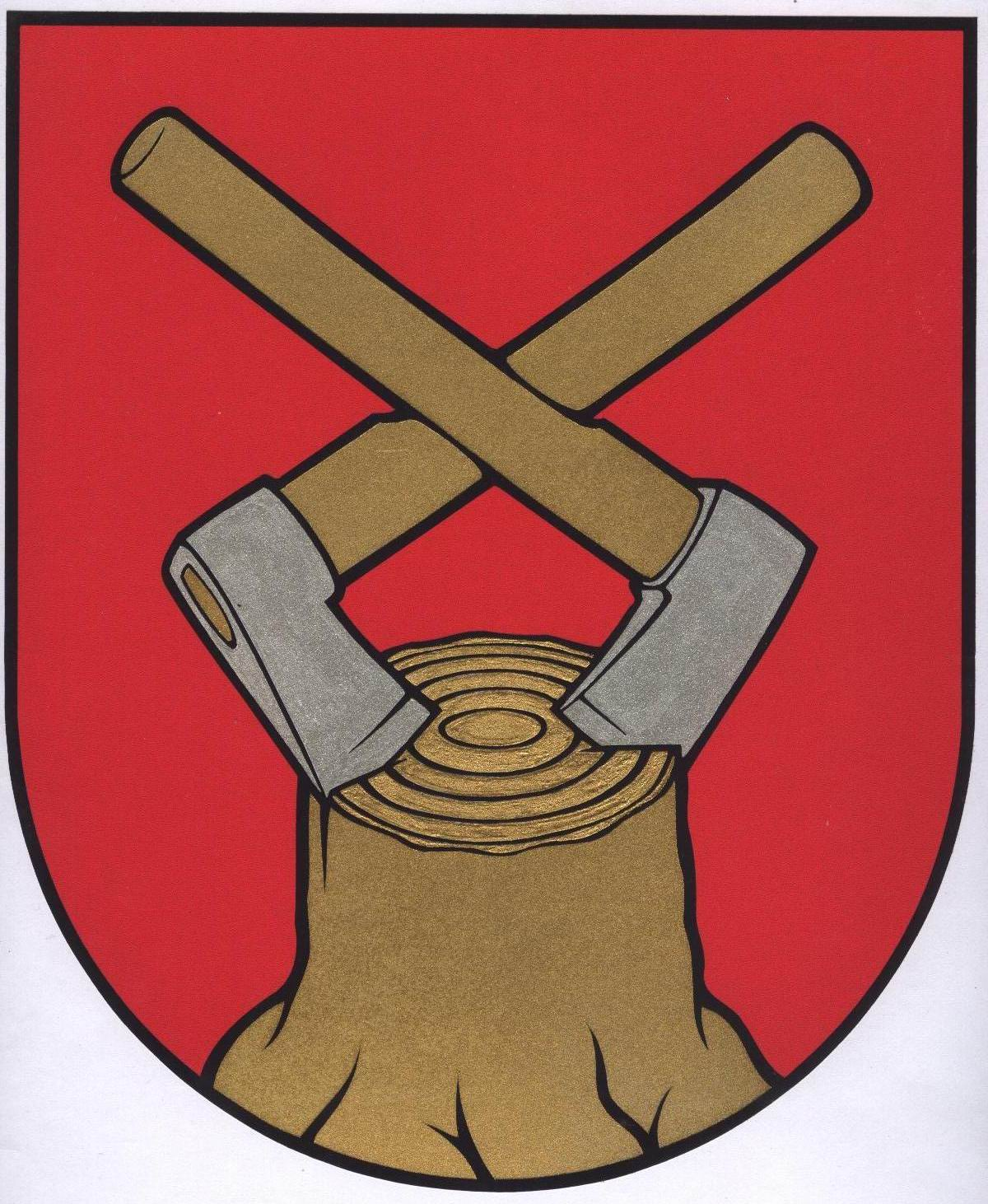
- Flag Coat of arms

- Location of Ruská Poruba in the Prešov Region Location of Ruská Poruba in Slovakia
- Coordinates: 49.15°N 21.80°E
- Country: Slovakia
- Region: Prešov Region
- District: Humenné District
- First mentioned: 1454

Area
  - Total: 12.02 km^{2} (4.64 sq mi)
- Elevation: 236 m (774 ft)

Population (2025)
  - Total: 205
- Time zone: UTC+1 (CET)
  - Summer (DST): UTC+2 (CEST)
- Postal code: 940 8
- Area code: +421 57
- Vehicle registration plate (until 2022): HE

Ruská Poruba is a village and municipality in Humenné District in the Prešov Region of north-east Slovakia.

== History ==
In historical records the village was first mentioned in 1454.

== Geography ==
The municipality lies at an altitude of 236 metres (774 ft) and covers an area of 12.02 km^{2} (4.64 sq mi) (2025).

== Population ==
Population statistic (10 years)
Year	1995	2005	2015	2025
Count	272	280	234	205
Difference		+2.94%	−16.42%	−12.39%

Population statistic
Year	2024	2025
Count	205	205
Difference		+1.42%

It has a population of 205 people (31 December 2025).

=== Ethnicity ===
Census 2021 (1+ %)
Ethnicity	Number	Fraction
Rusyn	156	72.89%
Slovak	121	56.54%
Not found out	7	3.27%
Total	214	

In year 2021 was 214 people by ethnicity 156 as Rusyn, 121 as Slovak, 7 as Not found out, 2 as Czech and 1 as Ukrainian.

Note on population: The difference values of population numbers in the table "Population statistic" and in the sections "Ethnicity" & "Religion" is caused by the use of various statistical methods.

=== Religion ===
Census 2021 (1+ %)
Religion	Number	Fraction
Greek Catholic Church	188	87.85%
Roman Catholic Church	18	8.41%
Eastern Orthodox Church	3	1.4%
None	3	1.4%
Total	214	

In year 2021 was 214 people by religion 188 from Greek Catholic Church, 18 from Roman Catholic Church, 3 from Eastern Orthodox Church, 3 from None and 2 from Not found out.
