= Kostrzyca, Pomeranian Voivodeship =

Kostrzyca
- Settlement
- Location within Poland
- Coordinates: 53°33′29″N 17°14′48″E
- Country: Poland
- Voivodeship: Pomeranian
- County: Człuchów
- Gmina: Debrzno
- Population: 9

Kostrzyca [kɔsˈtʂɨt͡sa] is a settlement in the administrative district of Gmina Debrzno, within Człuchów County, Pomeranian Voivodeship, in northern Poland.

For details of the history of the region, see History of Pomerania.
