= Kamenná Lhota =

- Municipality
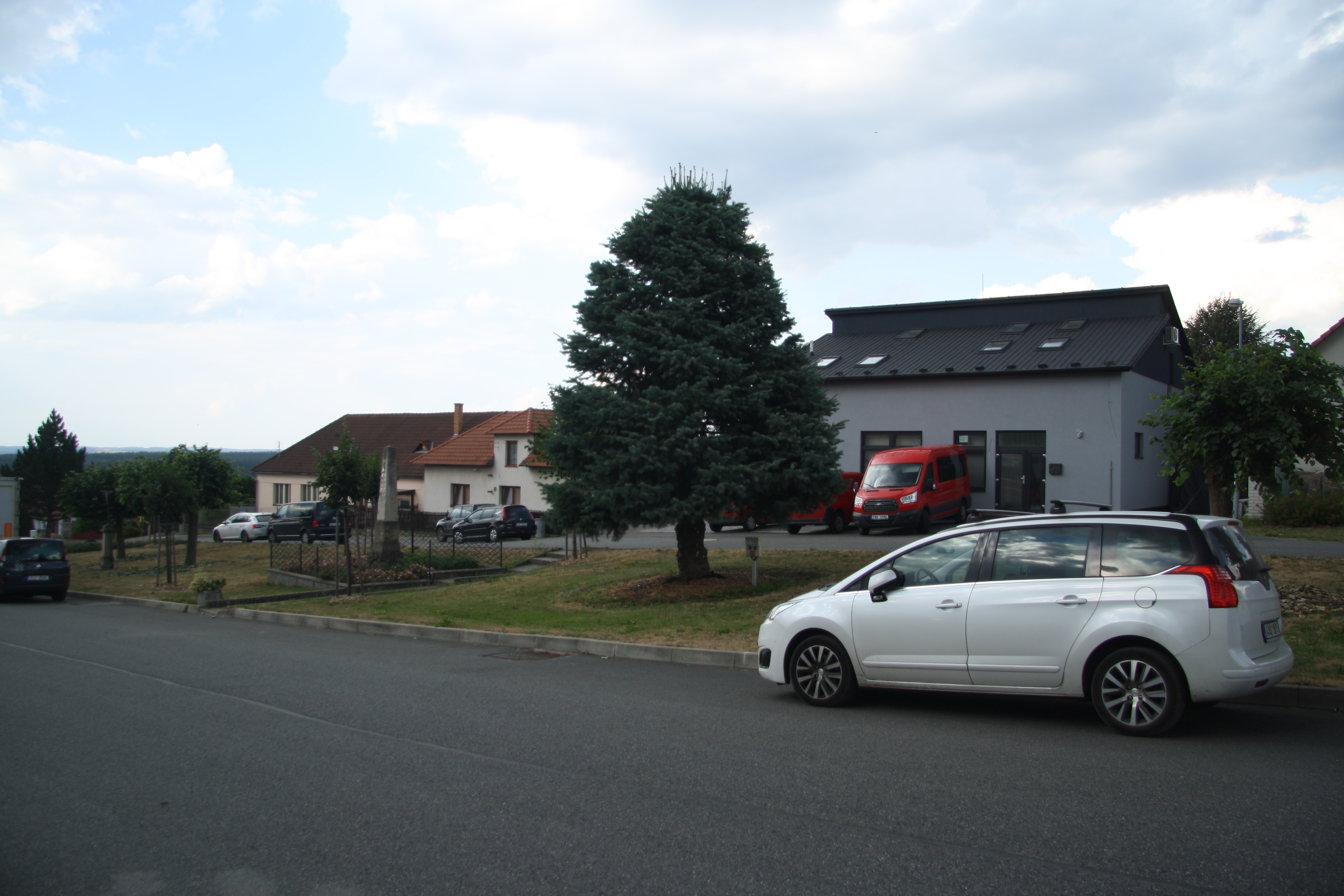
- Centre of Kamenná Lhota

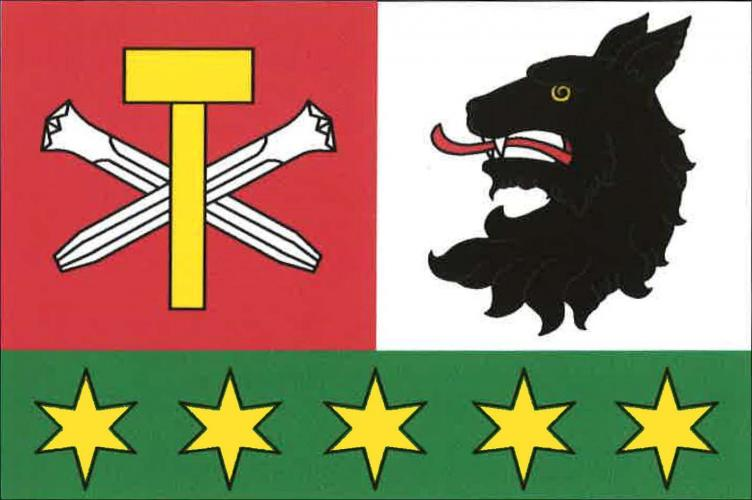
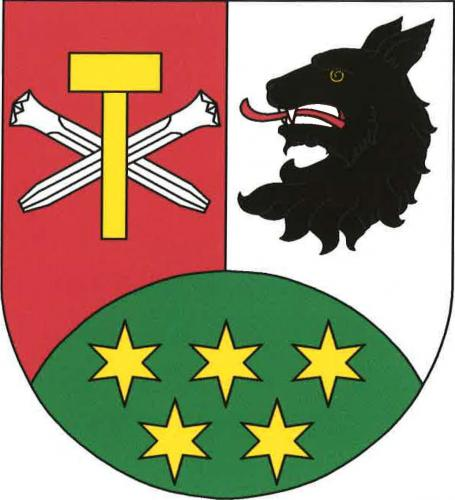
- Flag Coat of arms

- Location in the Czech Republic
- Coordinates: 49°38′38″N 15°16′31″E
- Country: Czech Republic
- Region: Vysočina
- District: Havlíčkův Brod
- First mentioned: 1380

Area
  - Total: 5.98 km^{2} (2.31 sq mi)
- Elevation: 502 m (1,647 ft)

Population (2026-01-01)
  - Total: 253
  - Density: 42.3/km^{2} (110/sq mi)
- Time zone: UTC+1 (CET)
  - Summer (DST): UTC+2 (CEST)
- Postal codes: 582 92, 584 01
- Website: www.kamenna-lhota.cz

Kamenná Lhota is a municipality and village in Havlíčkův Brod District in the Vysočina Region of the Czech Republic. It has about 300 inhabitants.

Kamenná Lhota lies approximately 23 kilometres (14 mi) west of Havlíčkův Brod, 36 km (22 mi) north-west of Jihlava, and 79 km (49 mi) south-east of Prague.

== Administrative division ==
Kamenná Lhota consists of two municipal parts (in brackets population according to the 2021 census):

- Kamenná Lhota (249)
- Dolní Paseka (10)

== Demographics ==
Historical population
| Year | Pop. | ±% |
|---|---|---|
| 1869 | 335 | — |
| 1880 | 345 | +3.0% |
| 1890 | 331 | −4.1% |
| 1900 | 369 | +11.5% |
| 1910 | 394 | +6.8% |
| 1921 | 373 | −5.3% |
| 1930 | 344 | −7.8% |
| 1950 | 263 | −23.5% |
| 1961 | 261 | −0.8% |
| 1970 | 255 | −2.3% |
| 1980 | 258 | +1.2% |
| 1991 | 248 | −3.9% |
| 2001 | 249 | +0.4% |
| 2011 | 241 | −3.2% |
| 2021 | 259 | +7.5% |
Source: Censuses
