= Eucharistic Youth Movement =

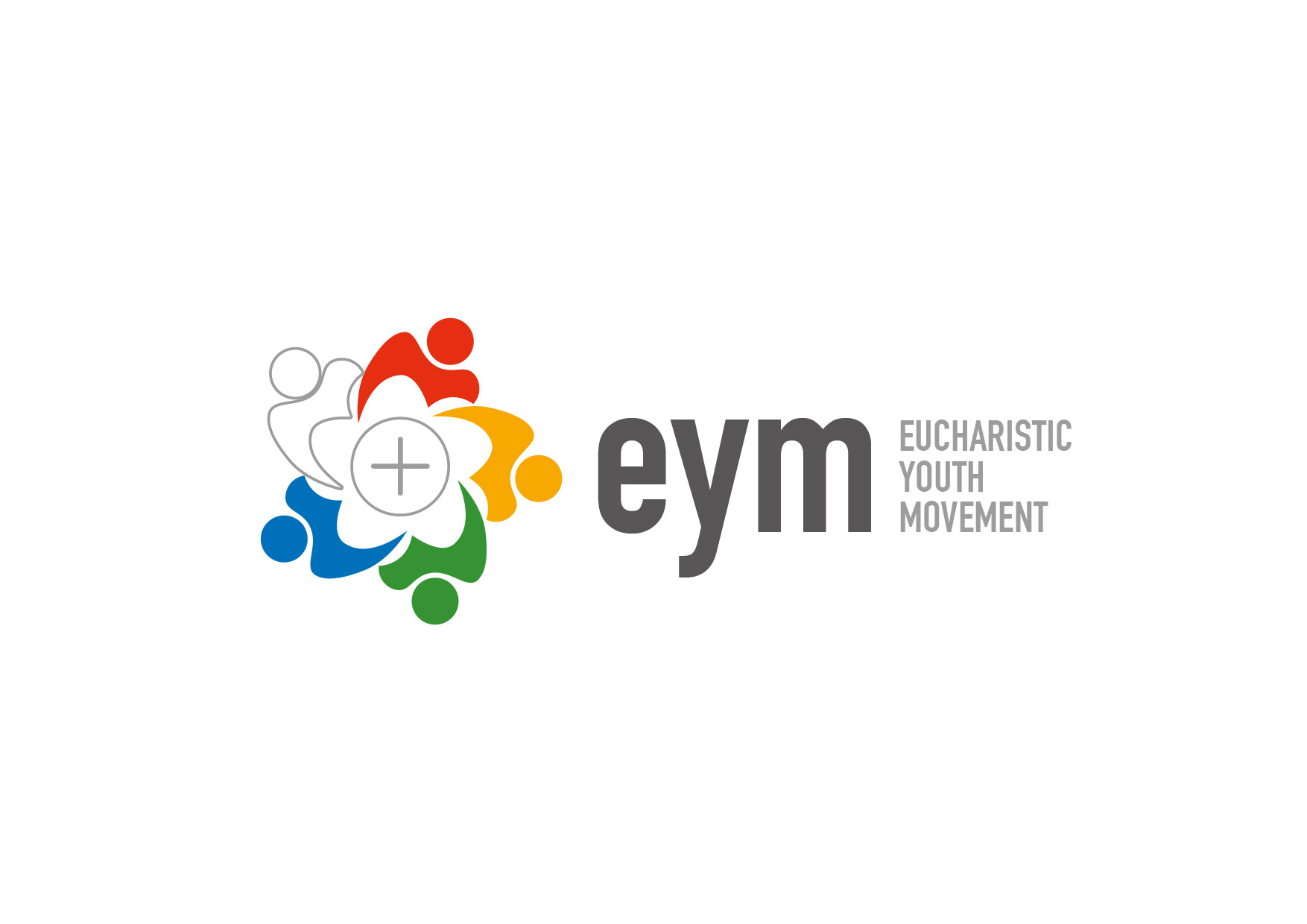
EYM official logo

The Eucharistic Youth Movement (EYM) is an international Catholic educational movement oriented to youth, originated in 1914 in France as the Eucharistic Crusade. It began its pedagogical renewal in 1962, calling itself the Eucharistic Youth Movement. It is the youth branch of the Pope's Worldwide Prayer Network.

This movement is made up of young people from 5 to 25 years of age and is present in more than 59 countries.
