= Jasienica, Lesser Poland Voivodeship =

Jasienica
- Village
- Location within Poland
- Coordinates: 49°50′N 19°51′E
- Country: Poland
- Voivodeship: Lesser Poland
- County: Myślenice
- Gmina: Myślenice
- Population: 1,500

Jasienica [jaɕɛˈnit͡sa] is a village in the administrative district of Gmina Myślenice, within Myślenice County, Lesser Poland Voivodeship, in southern Poland.
