= Poręba, Pomeranian Voivodeship =

Poręba
- Village
- Location within Poland
- Coordinates: 53°32′23″N 17°20′10″E
- Country: Poland
- Voivodeship: Pomeranian
- County: Człuchów
- Gmina: Debrzno

Poręba (Polish pronunciation: [pɔˈrɛmba]) is a village in the administrative district of Gmina Debrzno, within Człuchów County, Pomeranian Voivodeship, in northern Poland. In 2006, the population was 8,784.

For details of the history of the region, see History of Pomerania.
