= Buka, Pomeranian Voivodeship =

Buka
- Village
- Location within Poland
- Coordinates: 53°30′47″N 17°21′0″E
- Country: Poland
- Voivodeship: Pomeranian
- County: Człuchów
- Gmina: Debrzno
- Population: 74

Buka [ˈbuka] is a village in the administrative district of Gmina Debrzno, within Człuchów County, Pomeranian Voivodeship, in northern Poland.

For details of the history of the region, see History of Pomerania.
