= Kamenná (Třebíč District) =

- Municipality
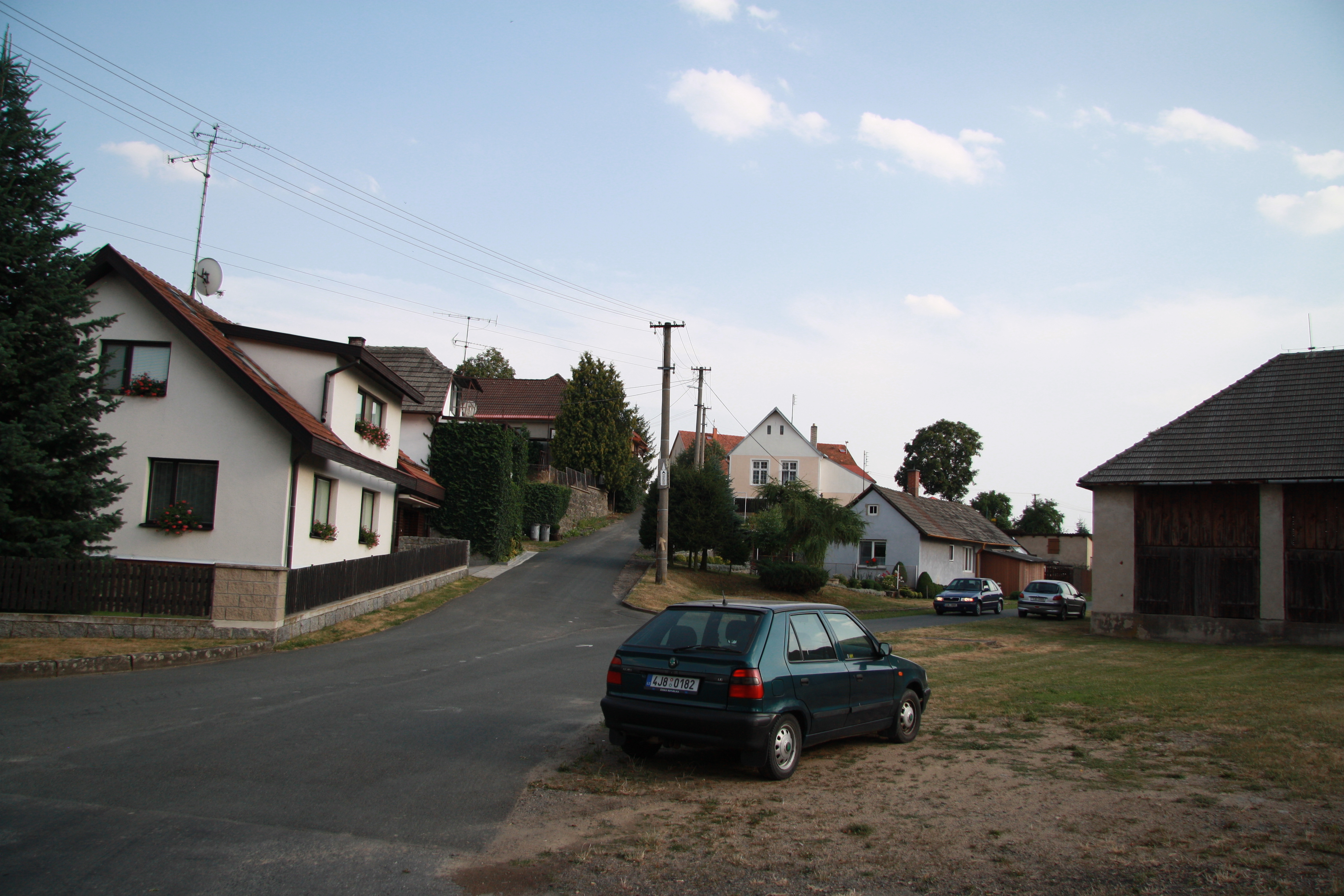
- Centre of Kamenná

- Location in the Czech Republic
- Coordinates: 49°16′21″N 16°3′37″E
- Country: Czech Republic
- Region: Vysočina
- District: Třebíč
- First mentioned: 1349

Area
  - Total: 6.11 km^{2} (2.36 sq mi)
- Elevation: 450 m (1,480 ft)

Population (2026-01-01)
  - Total: 221
  - Density: 36.2/km^{2} (93.7/sq mi)
- Time zone: UTC+1 (CET)
  - Summer (DST): UTC+2 (CEST)
- Postal code: 675 03
- Website: kamenna-tr.cz

Kamenná is a municipality and village in Třebíč District in the Vysočina Region of the Czech Republic. It has about 200 inhabitants.

Kamenná lies approximately 15 kilometres (9 mi) north-east of Třebíč, 37 km (23 mi) east of Jihlava, and 149 km (93 mi) south-east of Prague.

== Administrative division ==
Kamenná consists of two municipal parts (in brackets population according to the 2021 census):

- Kamenná (187)
- Klementice (22)

== Demographics ==
Historical population
Year	Pop.	±%
1869	406	—
1880	410	+1.0%
1890	407	−0.7%
1900	384	−5.7%
1910	364	−5.2%
1921	358	−1.6%
1930	352	−1.7%
1950	283	−19.6%
1961	290	+2.5%
1970	289	−0.3%
1980	251	−13.1%
1991	229	−8.8%
2001	230	+0.4%
2011	213	−7.4%
2021	209	−1.9%
Source: Censuses
