= Pope's Worldwide Prayer Network =

Pontifical work of the Catholic Church

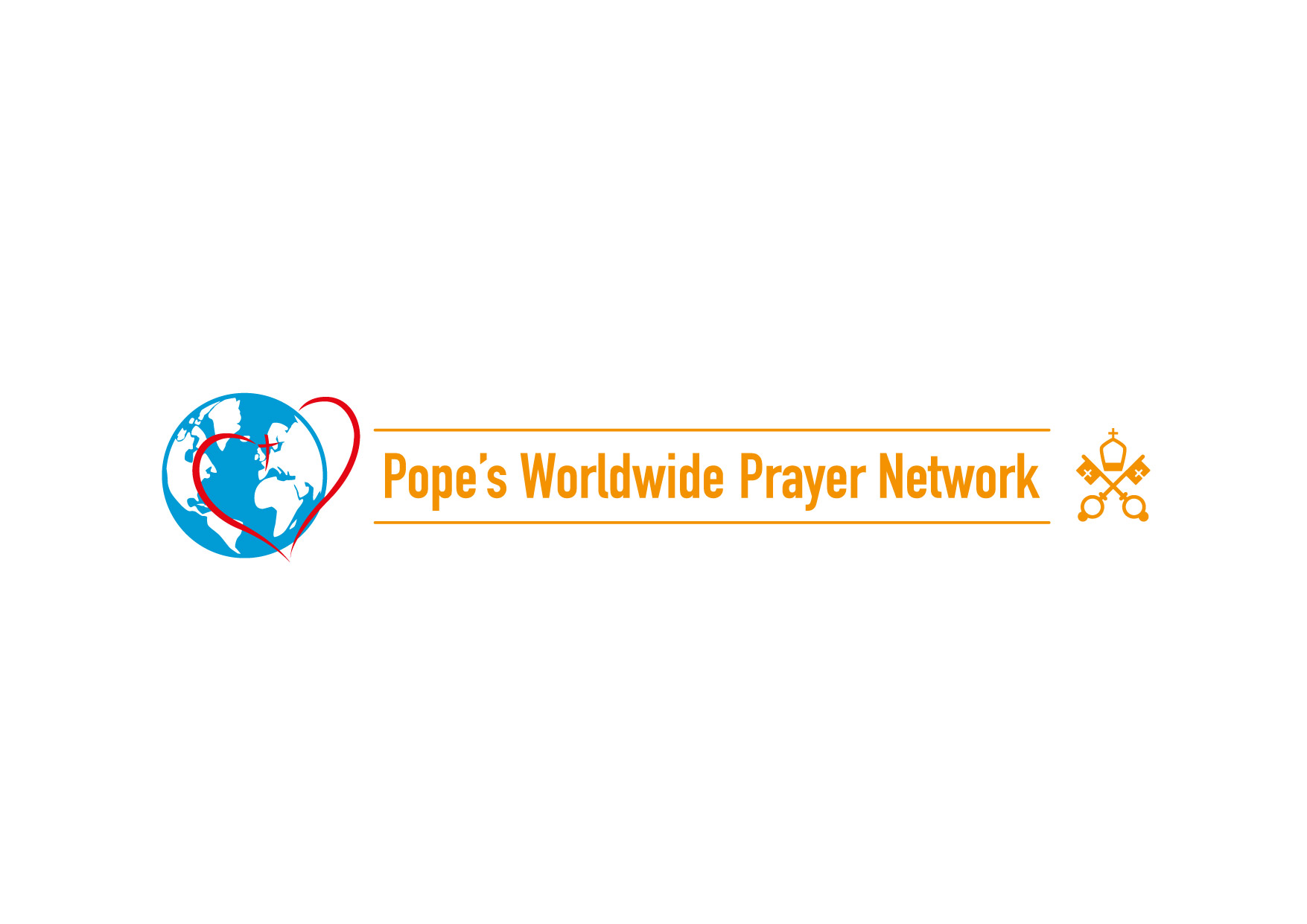
Official logo of the Pope's Worldwide Prayer Network

The Pope's Worldwide Prayer Network is a Pontifical Society of the Catholic Church which encourages Catholics to prayer and action as part of the church's universal mission. The Network provides monthly prayer intentions determined by the Pope. It is particularly inspired by devotions to the Sacred Heart of Jesus and His compassion for the world.

== Overview ==
Founded in 1844 as the Apostleship of Prayer and renamed in 2016, this ecclesiastic service became a pontifical work in March 2018 when Pope Francis approved the new statutes. In December 2020, the Pope constituted this Pontifical Society as a Vatican Foundation.

It is present in 89 countries with a membership of more than 22 million Catholics worldwide.

The International Director of the PWPN is Cristóbal Fones, S.J. who took office on January 1, 2025. He succeeded Frédéric Fornos, S.J. who was appointed in 2016.

== History: The Apostleship of Prayer ==
=== The beginnings ===
The Apostleship of Prayer was founded in 1844 in the south of France. The initiative was first proposed by a Jesuit priest, Francis Xavier Gautrelet, who at the time was the spiritual director of Jesuit students in Vals-près-le-Puy in the south of France. On the eve of the feast day of Saint Francis Xavier (2 December 1844), he outlined the idea to them in meditation. This initiative was later developed into the Apostleship of Prayer, which is now known as the Pope's Worldwide Prayer Network.

The concrete practice that Father Gautrelet suggested to his students to keep this spirit alive was a prayer every morning to offer up the day.

=== Further developments ===
In 1861, Jesuit Father Henri Ramière provided a new dynamism for the Apostleship and framed this proposal in a missionary perspective: devotion to the Sacred Heart of Jesus. Father Ramiére formalized and structured the Apostleship of Prayer and is considered, after Father Gautrelet, a second founder.

The practices of the Apostleship of Prayer spread widely among local farmers and young Christians in the countryside around Vals-près-le-Puy. In just a few years, this prayer proposal gained popularity throughout France and reached millions of followers worldwide. Apostleship of Prayer groups formed in Catholic parishes and institutions while the original idea took on a visible structured form as an ecclesiastic association.

=== The Pope’s prayer intentions ===
Between 1890 and 1896, Pope Leo XIII became interested in participating in this immense network of Catholics offering their lives and their dedication to spiritually supporting the mission of the Church. He incorporated the Apostleship as a special mission of the Pope and entrusted the association to the Society of Jesus in the person of the Father General. He also began to commend a monthly prayer intention to the Apostleship of Prayer where he expressed his concerns and asked all Catholics to pray for them.

== The 21st century: the Pope’s Worldwide Prayer Network ==
From 2010 onwards, a process of reflection and discernment commenced with national directors and coordinators looking to adapt the Apostleship of Prayer to the 21st century. A proposal was presented to Pope Francis in 2014 and suggested the introduction of the “Pope’s Worldwide Prayer Network”, which was finally established in 2015 with a new logo.

On Sunday 8 January 2017, during the Angelus in St Peters Square, Pope Francis used the new name for the first time when he urged the faithful the world over to unite with him in prayer.

“I would also like to invite you to join in the Pope’s Worldwide Prayer Network, which spreads, also through social networks, the prayer intentions I propose for the Church each month. In this way, the Apostleship of Prayer moves forward and communion grows”.

Examples of the Pope's monthly intentions include "true human fraternity" (January 2022) and "the abolition of torture" (June 2023).

In 2018, Pope Francis declared the PWPN, formerly known as the Apostleship of Prayer, a pontifical work with official headquarters in the State of the City of the Vatican. In December 2020, the Pope constituted this Pontifical Society as a Vatican Foundation.

=== The 175th Anniversary ===
On 28 June 2019, Pope Francis welcomed a delegation of his Worldwide Prayer Network to the Vatican on the 175th anniversary of the founding of the original Apostleship of Prayer. More than 6,000 delegates attended, along with another 7,500 members following on Facebook live.

The Holy See announced on 3 December 2020 that the Pope had established the Worldwide Prayer Network Foundation as an entity with a juridical identity.

== The Eucharistic Youth Movement ==
The PWPN includes a branch specifically dedicated to young people aged between seven and 18, known as the Eucharistic Youth Movement (EYM). The EYM helps its members to deepen their relationship with Jesus according to the Spiritual Exercises of Saint Ignatius.

The origins of the EYM go back to 1914, when the International Eucharist Congress of Lourdes called for “a great Eucharistic league of the very young, who from childhood onwards would reawaken a general movement towards Holy Communion". Beginning at that Eucharistic Congress, groups known as “Eucharistic leagues” or “Children’s Prayer Crusades” were formed. Some of these were connected to the Apostleship of Prayer. The Eucharistic Crusade is now part of EYM.

== Initiatives and projects ==
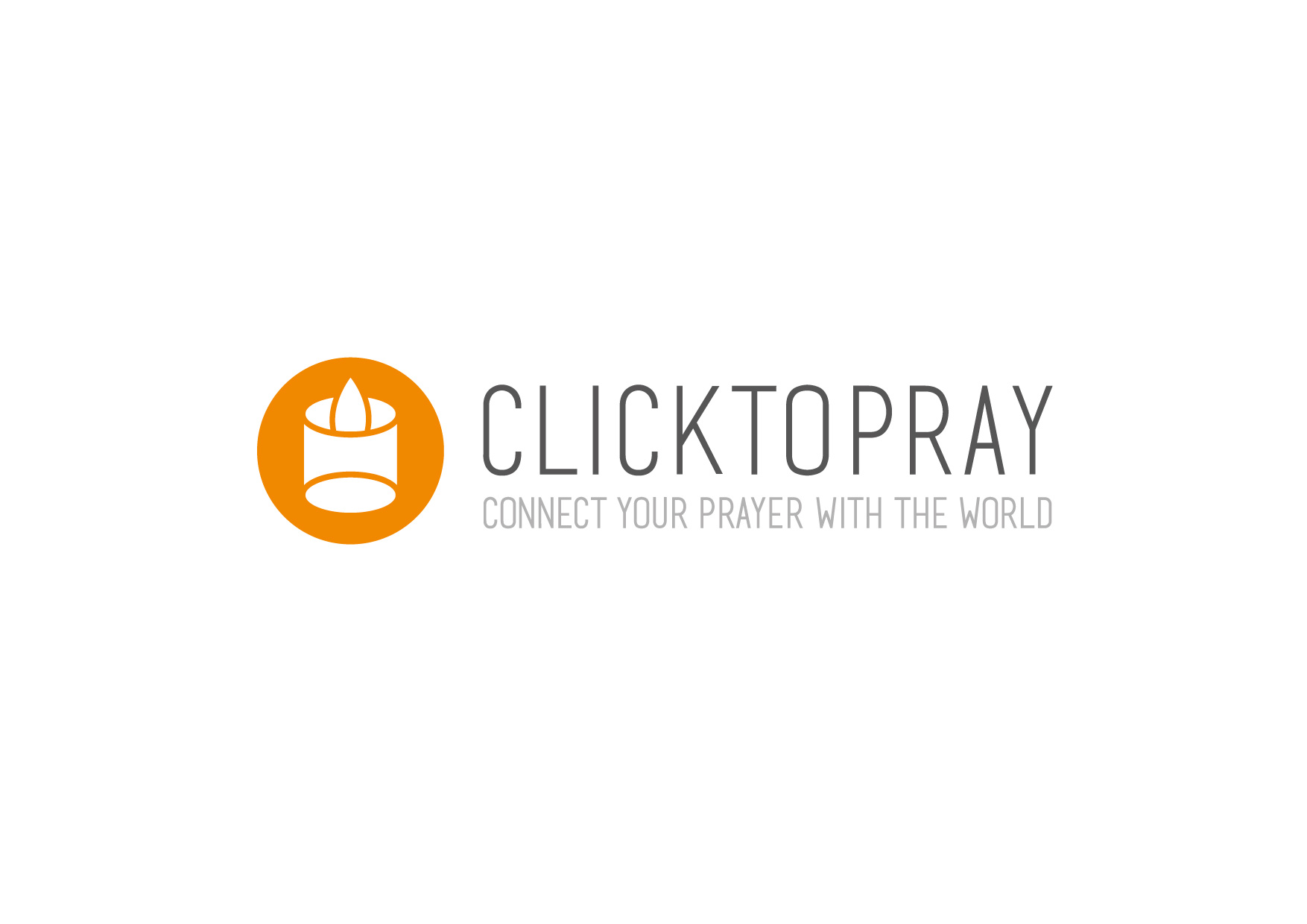
Click To Pray Official Logo

The renewal process for the PWPN worked to increase access to digital communication to reach young people. Consequently, several media initiatives and apps were launched, including Click To Pray app, the Pope Video, an eRosary and the Way of the Heart app.

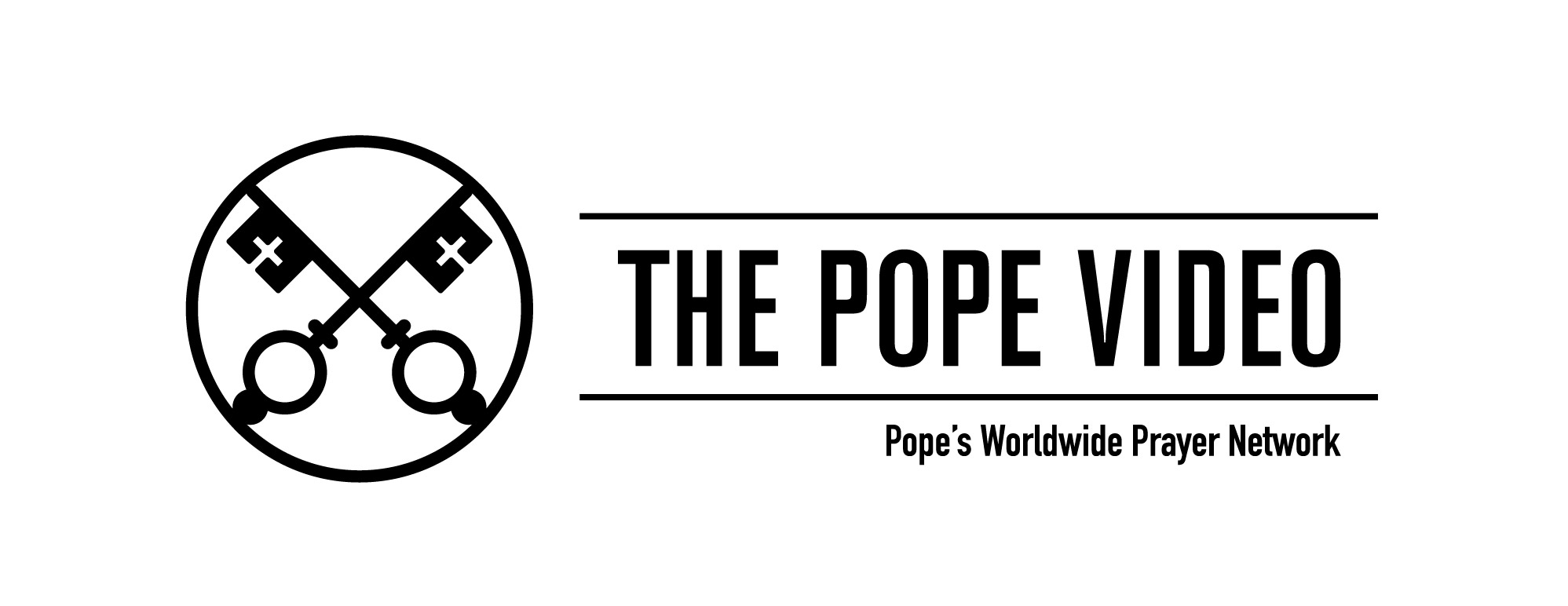
The Pope Video Official Logo

== See also ==
- Morning offering
