= Kamenná Poruba, Žilina District =

Village and municipality in Slovakia

Kamenná Poruba
- Municipality
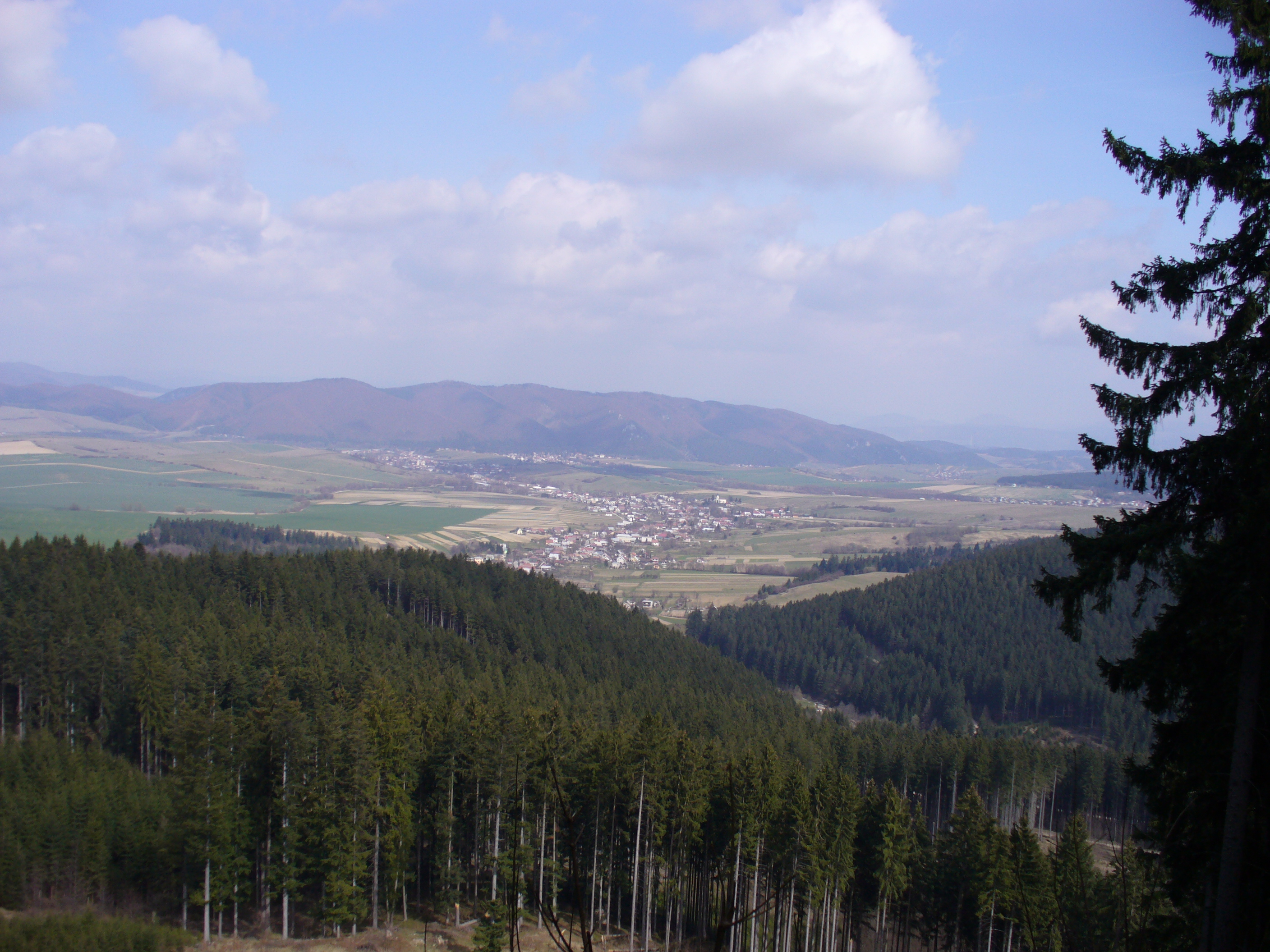

- Flag

- Location of Kamenná Poruba in the Žilina Region Location of Kamenná Poruba in Slovakia
- Coordinates: 49°05′20″N 18°41′12″E
- Country: Slovakia
- Region: Žilina Region
- District: Žilina District
- First mentioned: 1368

Area
  - Total: 14.18 km^{2} (5.47 sq mi)
- Elevation: 485 m (1,591 ft)

Population (2025)
  - Total: 1,859
- Time zone: UTC+1 (CET)
  - Summer (DST): UTC+2 (CEST)
- Postal code: 131 4
- Area code: +421 41
- Vehicle registration plate (until 2022): ZA
- Website: www.obeckamennaporuba.sk

Kamenná Poruba (Hungarian: Kővágás) is a village and municipality in Žilina District in the Žilina Region of northern Slovakia.

== History ==
In historical records the village was first mentioned in 1368.

== Geography ==
The municipality lies at an altitude of 485 metres (1,591 ft) and covers an area of 14.18 km^{2} (5.47 sq mi) (2025).

== Population ==
Population statistic (10 years)
Year	1995	2005	2015	2025
Count	1700	1807	1855	1859
Difference		+6.29%	+2.65%	+0.21%

Population statistic
Year	2024	2025
Count	1852	1859
Difference		+0.37%

It has a population of 1859 people (31 December 2025).

=== Ethnicity ===
Census 2021 (1+ %)
Ethnicity	Number	Fraction
Slovak	1838	99.03%
Total	1856	

In year 2021 was 1856 people by ethnicity 1838 as Slovak, 17 as Not found out, 10 as Other, 4 as Czech, 1 as Ukrainian, 1 as Rusyn, 1 as Russian, 1 as Polish, 1 as German and 1 as Moravian.

Note on population: The difference values of population numbers in the table "Population statistic" and in the sections "Ethnicity" & "Religion" is caused by the use of various statistical methods.

=== Religion ===
Census 2021 (1+ %)
Religion	Number	Fraction
Roman Catholic Church	1705	91.86%
None	107	5.77%
Total	1856	

In year 2021 was 1856 people by religion 1705 from Roman Catholic Church, 107 from None, 10 from Not found out, 8 from Jehovah's Witnesses, 6 from Islam, 6 from Greek Catholic Church, 4 from Ad hoc movements, 3 from Other and not ascertained christian church, 2 from Eastern Orthodox Church, 2 from Paganism and natural spirituality, 2 from Evangelical Church and 1 from Buddhism.

== Genealogical resources ==
The records for genealogical research are available at the state archive "Statny Archiv in Bytca, Slovakia"

- Roman Catholic church records (births/marriages/deaths): 1750-1910 (parish B)
- Lutheran church records (births/marriages/deaths): 1801-1907 (parish B)

== See also ==
- List of municipalities and towns in Slovakia
