= Kamenná Poruba, Vranov nad Topľou District =

Kamenná Poruba
- Municipality
- Flag

- Location of Kamenná Poruba in the Prešov Region Location of Kamenná Poruba in Slovakia
- Coordinates: 48°50′50″N 21°39′00″E
- Country: Slovakia
- Region: Prešov Region
- District: Vranov nad Topľou District
- First mentioned: 1402

Area
  - Total: 7.41 km^{2} (2.86 sq mi)
- Elevation: 150 m (490 ft)

Population (2025)
  - Total: 1,763
- Time zone: UTC+1 (CET)
  - Summer (DST): UTC+2 (CEST)
- Postal code: 930 3
- Area code: +421 57
- Vehicle registration plate (until 2022): VT
- Website: www.kamennaporuba.sk

Kamenná Poruba (Hungarian: Kővágó, until 1899: Kőporuba) is a village and municipality in Vranov nad Topľou District in the Prešov Region of eastern Slovakia.

== History ==
In historical records the village was first mentioned in 1402.

== Geography ==
The municipality lies at an altitude of 150 metres (490 ft) and covers an area of 7.41 km^{2} (2.86 sq mi) (2025).

== Population ==
Population statistic (10 years)
Year	1995	2005	2015	2025
Count	983	1167	1355	1763
Difference		+18.71%	+16.10%	+30.11%

Population statistic
Year	2024	2025
Count	1727	1763
Difference		+2.08%

It has a population of 1763 people (31 December 2025).

=== Ethnicity ===
Census 2021 (1+ %)
Ethnicity	Number	Fraction
Slovak	1442	93.15%
Romani	969	62.59%
Not found out	102	6.58%
Total	1548	

In year 2021 was 1548 people by ethnicity 1442 as Slovak, 969 as Romani, 102 as Not found out, 4 as Czech, 4 as Rusyn, 3 as Polish, 1 as Jewish and 1 as Silesian.

Note on population: The difference values of population numbers in the table "Population statistic" and in the sections "Ethnicity" & "Religion" is caused by the use of various statistical methods.

The vast majority of the municipality's population consists of the local Roma community. In 2019, they constituted an estimated 75% of the local population.

=== Religion ===
Census 2021 (1+ %)
Religion	Number	Fraction
Greek Catholic Church	967	62.47%
Roman Catholic Church	345	22.29%
None	108	6.98%
Not found out	94	6.07%
Total	1548	

In year 2021 was 1548 people by religion 967 from Greek Catholic Church, 345 from Roman Catholic Church, 108 from None, 94 from Not found out, 14 from Evangelical Church, 14 from Apostolic Church, 3 from Christian Congregations in Slovakia, 1 from Other, 1 from Czechoslovak Hussite Church and 1 from Seventh-day Adventist Church.

== Genealogical resources ==
The records for genealogical research are available at the state archive "Statny Archiv in Presov, Slovakia"

- Roman Catholic church records (births/marriages/deaths): 1770-1895 (parish B)
- Greek Catholic church records (births/marriages/deaths): 1780-1933 (parish B)

== See also ==
- List of municipalities and towns in Slovakia
