= Człuchów–Słosinko railway =

Railway line in Poland

Człuchów - Słosinko
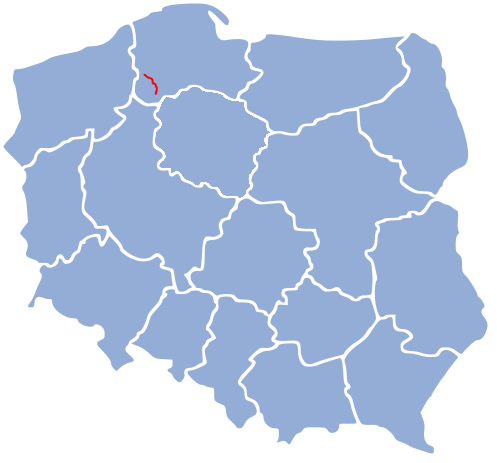

Overview
- Termini: Człuchów; Słosinko
- Stations: 12

Service
- Type: Freight
- Services: 1
- Operator(s): PKP PLK

History
- Opened: 1902

Technical
- Line length: 55.065 km (34.216 mi)
- Character: Freight form Człuchów to Sąpolno Czł. Closed from Przechlewo to Słosinko
- Track gauge: 1,435 mm (4 ft 8 1/2 in)
- Electrification: No

Człuchów - Słosinko line is a PKP railway line in Pomeranian Voivodship, Poland. In PKP D29 classification system the line was numbered 413 with a maximum allowed speed of 50 km/h.

== History ==
The line was opened in 1902 was opened on route from Człuchów to Czosnowo, and later this year it reached Słosinko.

The whole line was closed for passenger transport in 1991, and one year later the part from Przechlewo to Słosinko was closed for all transport. The closed part is now partly dismantled or unavailable.

== Stations on the line ==
Listed from east to west:

Station	Line km	Status
Człuchów	0.0 km	Active
Kiełpin	6.901 km	Closed
Polnica	10.474 km	Closed
Czosnowo	17.582 km	Closed
Sąpolno Człuchowskie	20.642 km	Closed
Przechlewo	24.689 km	Closed
Nowa Wieś Człuchowska	30.516 km	Closed
Nowa Brda	36.228 km	Closed
Bielsko Pomorskie	41,921 km	Closed
Koczała	46.234 km	Closed
Łękinia	50.317 km	Closed
Słosinko	55.065 km	Active
