= Loza =

Loza may refer to:

== Places ==
- Loza, Álava, a village in the Basque Country, Spain
- Loza, Bulgaria, a village in Gabrovo Province, Bulgaria
- Loza (Plzeň-North District), a municipality and village in the Czech Republic
- Łoza, a village in Sztum County, Poland
- Łoża, a village in Człuchów County, Poland
- Loza River, a river in northern Madagascar that crosses Antsohihy

== People ==
- Loza (surname)
- Loza Abera, Ethiopian footballer
- Loza Maléombho, Ivorian American fashion designer
