= Dolinka =

Dolinka literally means "small valley" in several Slavic languages. It may refer to:

- Dolinka, Altai Krai, Russia
- Dolinka, Człuchów County, Poland
- Dolinka, Karaganda, Kazakhstan
- Dolinka, Slovakia
