= Łękinia railway station =

Railway station in Łękinia, Poland

Łękinia

General information
- Location: Łękinia; Poland
- Coordinates: 53.910898°N 17.019027°E
- Owner: Polskie Koleje Państwowe S.A.
- Platforms: 1

Construction
- Structure type: Building: Yes (no longer used); Depot: Never existed Water tower: Never existed

History
- Former names: Flötenstein
Location

Łękinia is a former PKP railway station in Łękinia (Pomeranian Voivodeship), Poland.

== Lines crossing the station ==
Start station	End station	Line type
Człuchów	Słosinko	Closed
