= Domisław railway station =

Railway station in Pomeranian Voivodeship, Poland

Coordinates: 53.6678°N 17.0331°E

Domisław

General information
- Location: Domisław, Pomeranian Voivodeship; Poland
- System: Railway Station
- Operator: Polregio
- Line: 210: Chojnice–Runowo Pomorskie railway
- Platforms: 2
- Tracks: 2
Location
- Location within Poland

Domisław railway station is a railway station serving the village of Domisław, in the Pomeranian Voivodeship, Poland. The station is located on the Chojnice–Runowo Pomorskie railway. The train services are operated by Polregio.

The station used to be called Domislaff.

== Train services ==
The station is served by the following service(s):

- Regional services (R) Słupsk — Miastko — Szczecinek — Chojnice
- Regional services (R) Szczecinek — Chojnice

Preceding station	Polregio	Following station
Czarne towards Szczecinek or Słupsk	PR	Bińcze towards Chojnice
