= Brzeźno Człuchowskie railway station =

Railway station in Człuchów County, Poland

Brzeźno Człuchowskie

General information
- Location: Brzeźno Człuchowskie, Pomeranian Voivodeship; Poland
- Operator: PKP Polskie Linie Kolejowe
- Line: Chojnice–Runowo Pomorskie
- Platforms: 2
- Tracks: 2
Location
- Location within Poland

Brzeźno Człuchowskie railway station is a railway station serving the village of Brzeźno Człuchowskie, in the Pomeranian Voivodeship, Poland. The station is located on the Chojnice–Runowo Pomorskie railway. The train services are operated by Polregio.

There used to be a railway between Brzeźno Człuchowskie and Wierzchowo Człuchowskie but this has now been dismantled.

== Train services ==
The station is served by the following service(s):

- Regional services (PR) Słupsk - Miastko - Szczecinek - Chojnice
- Regional services (PR) Szczecinek - Chojnice

| Preceding station | Polregio | Following station |
|---|---|---|
| Człuchów towards Szczecinek or Słupsk | PR | Chojnice Terminus |
