= Zdrojki =

Zdrojki may refer to the following places in Poland:

- Zdrojki, Greater Poland Voivodeship (west-central Poland)
- Zdrojki, Podlaskie Voivodeship (north-east Poland)
- Zdrójki, Człuchów County, Pomeranian Voivodeship (north Poland)
- Zdrójki, Starogard County, Pomeranian Voivodeship (north Poland)
