= Lisewo (disambiguation) =

Lisewo is a village in Kuyavian-Pomeranian Voivodeship (north-central Poland).

Lisewo may also refer to:

- Lisewo, Golub-Dobrzyń County in Kuyavian-Pomeranian Voivodeship (north-central Poland)
- Lisewo, Masovian Voivodeship (east-central Poland)
- Lisewo, Konin County in Greater Poland Voivodeship (west-central Poland)
- Lisewo, Września County in Greater Poland Voivodeship (west-central Poland)
- Lisewo, Człuchów County in Pomeranian Voivodeship (north Poland)
- Lisewo, Puck County in Pomeranian Voivodeship (north Poland)
- Lisewo, Wejherowo County in Pomeranian Voivodeship (north Poland)
- Lisewo, Warmian-Masurian Voivodeship (north Poland)
