= Biskupnica railway station =

Railway station in Biskupnica, Poland

Coordinates: 53.6550°N 17.2119°E

Biskupnica

General information
- Location: Biskupnica, Pomeranian Voivodeship; Poland
- Operator: Polregio
- Line: Chojnice–Runowo Pomorskie
- Platforms: 2
- Tracks: 2
Location
- Location within Poland

Biskupnica railway station is a railway station serving the village of Biskupnica, in the Pomeranian Voivodeship, Poland. The station is located on the Chojnice–Runowo Pomorskie railway. The train services are operated by Polregio.

The station used to be known as Bischofswalde (Kr. Schlochau) when it was part of Germany.

== Train services ==
The station is served by the following service(s):

- Regional services (PR) Słupsk - Miastko - Szczecinek - Chojnice
- Regional services (PR) Szczecinek - Chojnice

Preceding station	Polregio	Following station
Bińcze towards Szczecinek or Słupsk	PR	Człuchów towards Chojnice
