= Trzęsacz =

Trzęsacz may refer to the following places in Poland:

- Trzęsacz, Gryfice County in West Pomeranian Voivodeship (north-west Poland)
- Trzęsacz, Kuyavian-Pomeranian Voivodeship (north-central Poland)
- Trzęsacz, Człuchów County in Pomeranian Voivodeship (north Poland)
- Trzęsacz, Choszczno County in West Pomeranian Voivodeship (north-west Poland)
