= Kleśnik =

- Settlement
- Location within Poland
- Coordinates: 53°44′15″N 17°13′14″E
- Country: Poland
- Voivodeship: Pomeranian
- County: Człuchów
- Gmina: Przechlewo
- Population: 35

Kleśnik [ˈklɛɕnik] is a settlement in the administrative district of Gmina Przechlewo, within Człuchów County, Pomeranian Voivodeship, in northern Poland. It lies approximately 8 km (5 mi) south of Przechlewo, 14 km (9 mi) north-west of Człuchów, and 116 km (72 mi) south-west of the regional capital Gdańsk.

For details of the history of the region, see History of Pomerania.
