= Czarne railway station =

Railway station in Czarne, Poland

Czarne
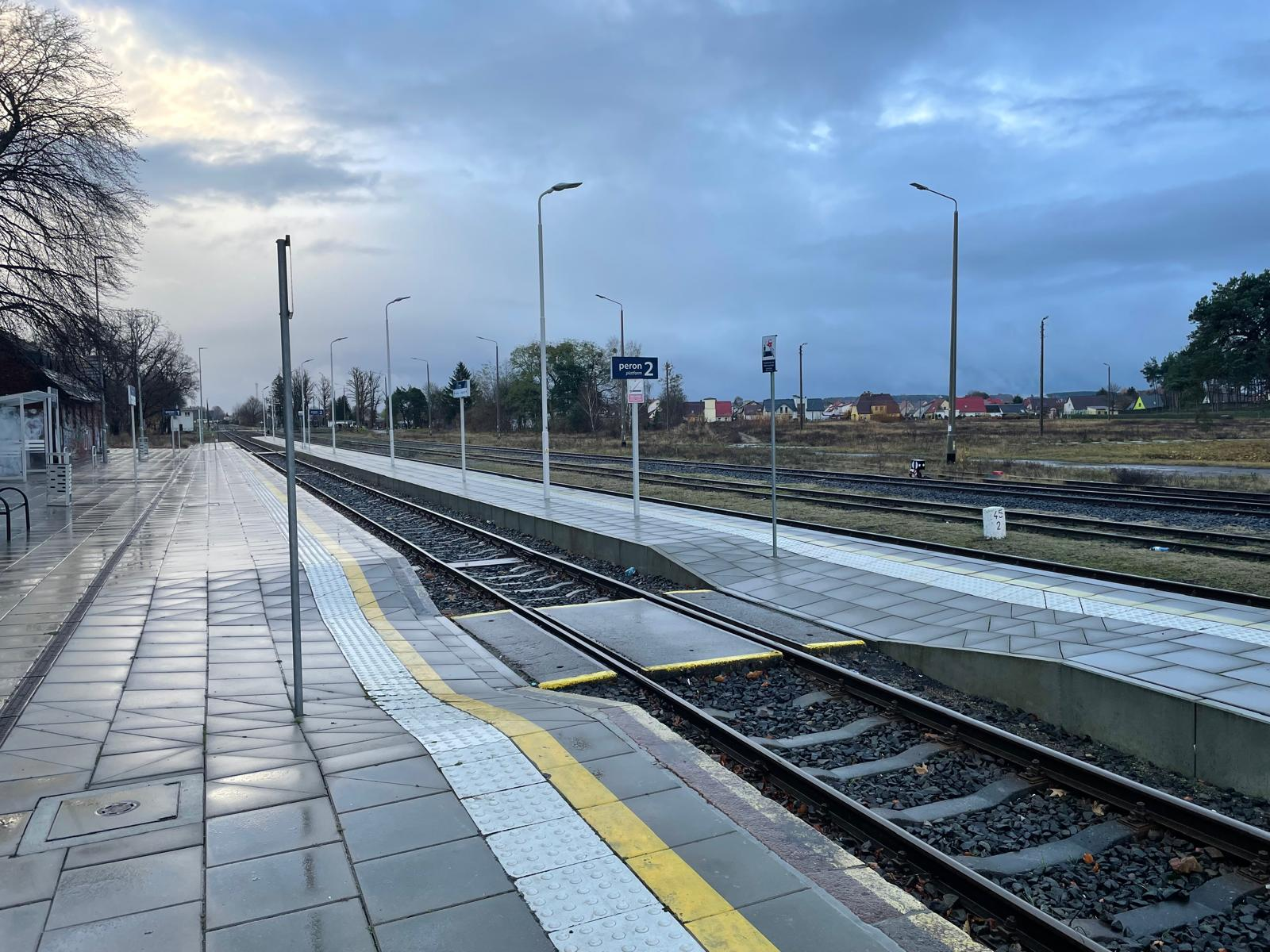
- Station in December 2024

General information
- Location: Czarne, Pomeranian Voivodeship; Poland
- Operator: Polregio
- Line: Chojnice–Runowo Pomorskie railway
- Platforms: 2
- Tracks: 2

History
- Former names: Hamerstein (before 1945)
Location
- Location within Poland Location within Pomeranian Voivodeship

Czarne railway station is a railway station serving the town of Czarne, in the Pomeranian Voivodeship, Poland. The station is located on the Chojnice–Runowo Pomorskie railway. The train services are operated by Polregio.

== Train services ==
The station is served by the following service(s):

- Regional services (R) Słupsk — Miastko — Szczecinek — Chojnice
- Regional services (R) Szczecinek — Chojnice

Preceding station	Polregio	Following station
Żółtnica towards Szczecinek or Słupsk	PR	Domisław towards Chojnice
