= Bischofswalde =

Bischofswalde is a German place-name, and may refer to:

- Former name of Biskupów, Silesia, now in Poland
- Former name of Biskupnica, Pomerania, now in Poland
- Former name of Biskupice, part of Město Albrechtice (German: Olbersdorf), now in the Czech Republic
