= Bielsko Pomorskie railway station =

Railway station in Pomeranian Voivodeship, Poland

Bielsko Pomorskie

General information
- Location: Bielsko Pomorskie; Poland
- Coordinates: 53°52′57″N 17°7′56″E
- Owner: Polskie Koleje Państwowe S.A.

History
- Former names: Bölzig
Location

Bielsko Pomorskie is a former PKP railway station in Bielsko Pomorskie (Pomeranian Voivodeship), Poland.

== Lines crossing the station ==
| Start station | End station | Line type |
|---|---|---|
| Człuchów | Słosinko | Closed |
