= Ziethen =

Ziethen may refer to:

places in Germany

- Ziethen, Brandenburg, in the district of Barnim, Brandenburg
- Ziethen, Mecklenburg-Vorpommern, in the district of Vorpommern-Greifswald, Mecklenburg-Vorpommern
- Ziethen, Schleswig-Holstein, in the district of Lauenburg, Schleswig-Holstein

places in Poland

- Ziethen, the former German name of Szczytno, in Pomeranian Voivodeship, northern Poland

See also

- Zieten (disambiguation)
