= Bińcze railway station =

Railway station in Bińcze, Poland

Coordinates: 53.6600°N 17.1285°E

Bińcze
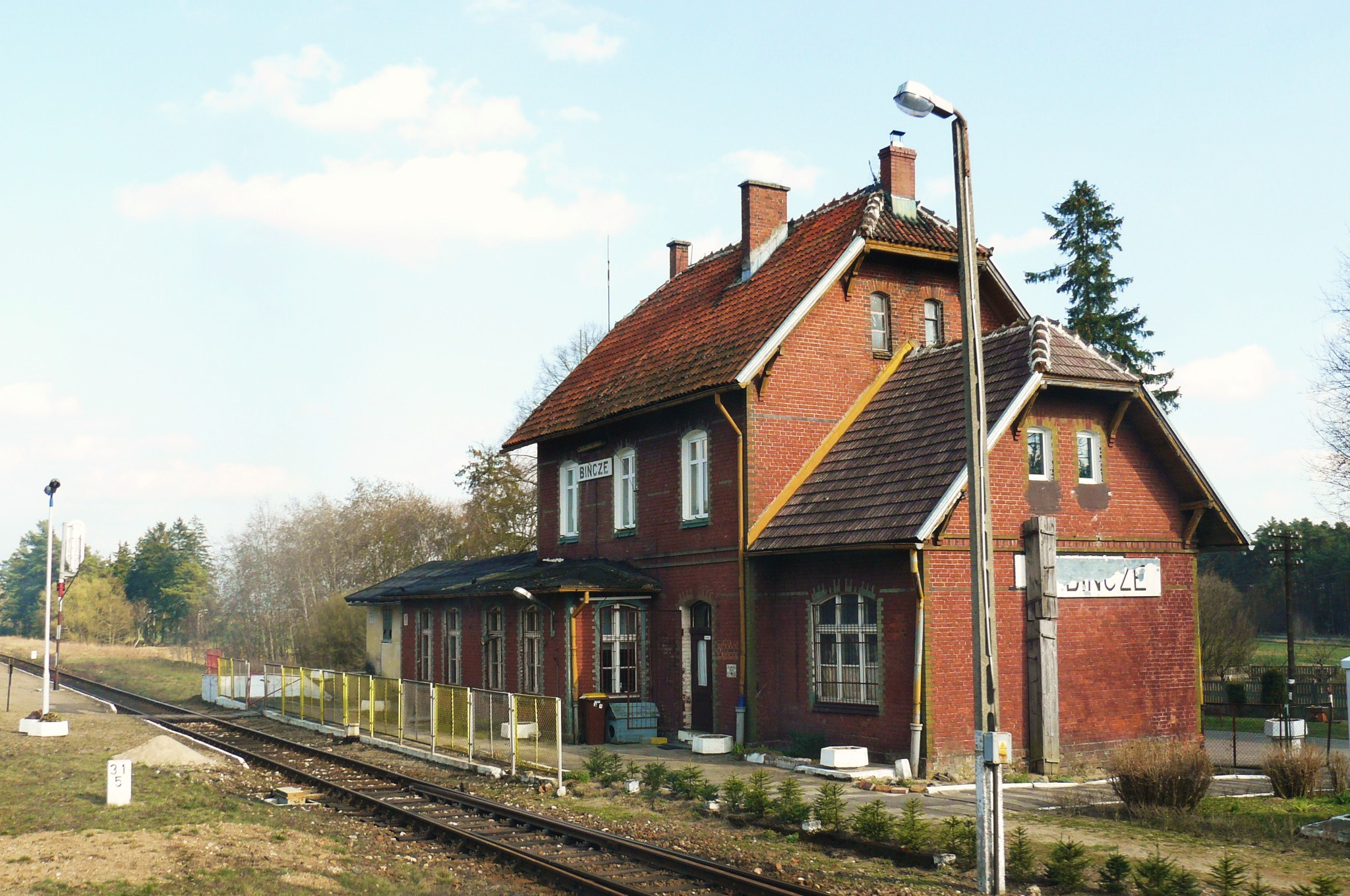
- Bińcze railway station

General information
- Location: Bińcze, Pomeranian Voivodeship; Poland
- System: Railway Station
- Operator: Polregio
- Line: Chojnice–Runowo Pomorskie
- Platforms: 2
- Tracks: 2
Location
- Location within Poland

Bińcze railway station is a railway station serving the village of Bińcze, in the Pomeranian Voivodeship, Poland. The station is located on the Chojnice–Runowo Pomorskie railway. The train services are operated by Polregio.

The station used to be called Bärenwalde (Kr. Schlochau).

== Train services ==
The station is served by the following service(s):

- Regional services (PR) Słupsk - Miastko - Szczecinek - Chojnice
- Regional services (PR) Szczecinek - Chojnice

Preceding station	Polregio	Following station
Domisław towards Szczecinek or Słupsk	PR	Biskupnica towards Chojnice
