= Zieten =

Zieten (pre-reform spelling Ziethen) may refer to:

People

- Hans Joachim von Zieten (1699–1786), Prussian general who served in the Silesian Wars
- Hans Ernst Karl, Graf von Zieten (1770–1848), Prussian General in the Napoleonic Wars
- Reiner Protsch von Zieten (born 1939), anthropologist usually known as Reiner Protsch.

Other

- Hussars Regiment of Zieten (Brandenburg) No. 3, an hussars regiment the Prussian/German Imperial Army
- SMS Zieten (ship, 1876) was the first torpedo-armed aviso built for the Imperial German Navy (Kaiserliche Marine).
- Zieten (horse)

See also

- Ziethen (disambiguation)
