= Wyczechy =

- Village
- Location within Poland
- Coordinates: 53°41′20″N 17°2′20″E
- Country: Poland
- Voivodeship: Pomeranian
- County: Człuchów
- Gmina: Czarne
- Population: 842

Wyczechy [vɨˈt͡ʂɛxɨ] (German: Geglenfelde) is a village in the administrative district of Gmina Czarne, within Człuchów County, Pomeranian Voivodeship, in northern Poland.

For details of the history of the region, see History of Pomerania.
