= Biernatka =

- Village
- Location within Poland
- Coordinates: 53°40′5″N 17°6′7″E
- Country: Poland
- Voivodeship: Pomeranian
- County: Człuchów
- Gmina: Czarne
- Population: 98

Biernatka [bjɛrˈnatka] is a village in the administrative district of Gmina Czarne, within Człuchów County, Pomeranian Voivodeship, in northern Poland.

Until 1771 it was part of Crown of the Kingdom of Poland and then of Kingdom of Prussia (see First Partition of Poland). For the history of the region, see History of Pomerania.
