= Suszka, Pomeranian Voivodeship =

Suszka
- Village
- Location within Poland
- Coordinates: 53°49′45″N 17°8′31″E
- Country: Poland
- Voivodeship: Pomeranian
- County: Człuchów
- Gmina: Przechlewo
- Population: 30

Suszka [ˈsuʂka] is a village in the administrative district of Gmina Przechlewo, within Człuchów County, Pomeranian Voivodeship, in northern Poland.

For details of the history of the region, see History of Pomerania.
