= Czarne =

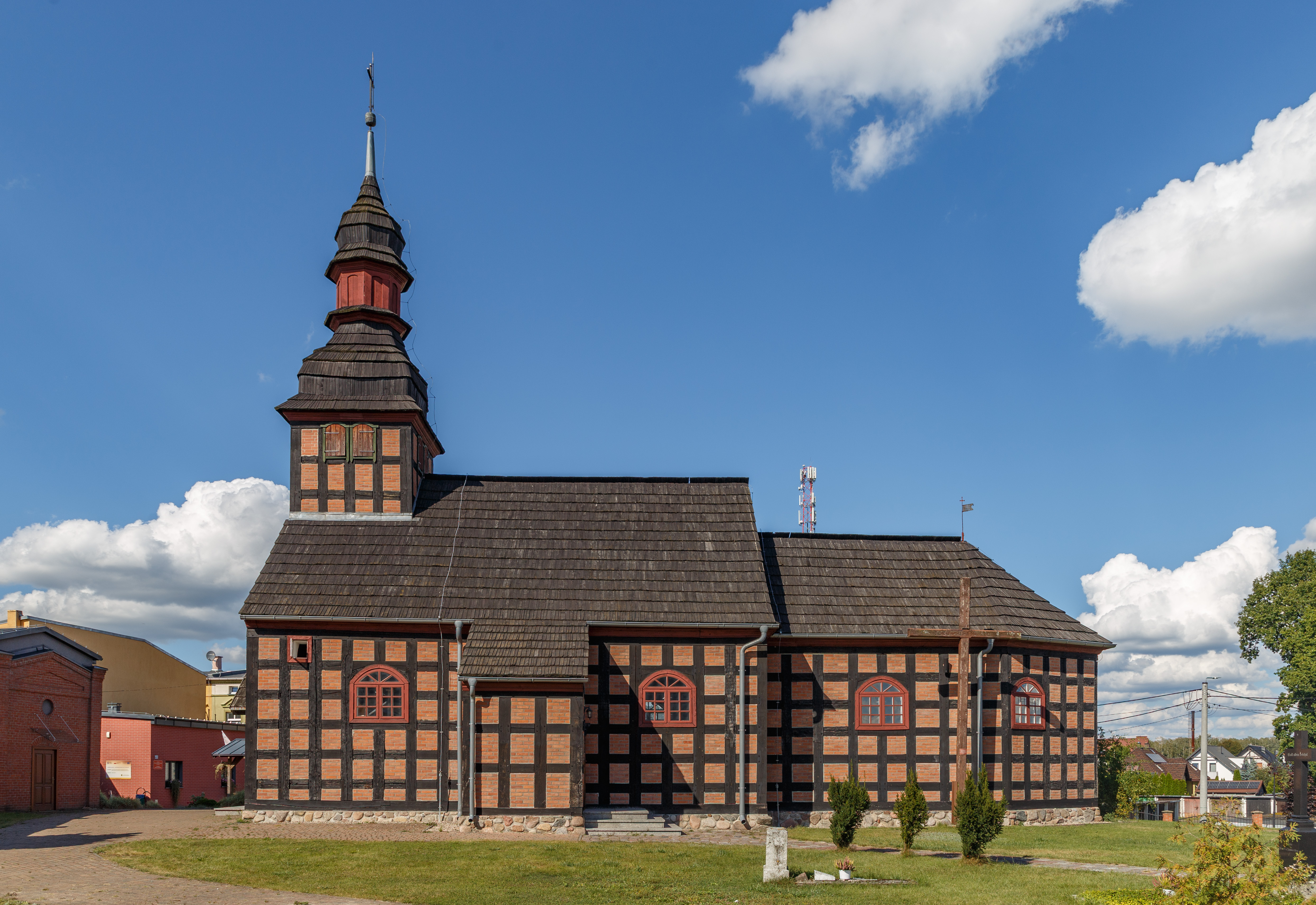
- Church of the Assumption from 1757

- Coat of arms

- Location within Poland
- Coordinates: 53°41′N 16°57′E
- Country: Poland
- Voivodeship: Pomeranian
- County: Człuchów
- Gmina: Czarne
- Town rights: 1395

Government
  - Mayor: Piotr Zabrocki

Area
  - Total: 46.39 km^{2} (17.91 sq mi)
- Elevation: 136 m (446 ft)

Population (31 December 2022)
  - Total: 5,368
  - Density: 115.7/km^{2} (299.7/sq mi)
- Time zone: UTC+1 (CET)
  - Summer (DST): UTC+2 (CEST)
- Postal code: 77-330
- Area code: +48 59
- Car plates: GCZ
- Website: http://www.czarne.pl

Czarne [ˈt͡ʂarnɛ] (Kashubian: Czôrné; German: Hammerstein) is a town in Człuchów County of the Pomeranian Voivodeship in northern Poland. As of December 2022, the town has a population of 5,368.

Founded in the Middle Ages and granted town rights in 1395, Czarne is a former royal town of Poland, which became most known as the place of a Polish victory over invading Swedes in 1627, and the location of German-operated prisoner-of-war camps for Allied soldiers of various nationalities during both world wars, where over 60,000 died during the Second World War. Since 1951, Czarne hosts a garrison of the Polish Army.

== History ==
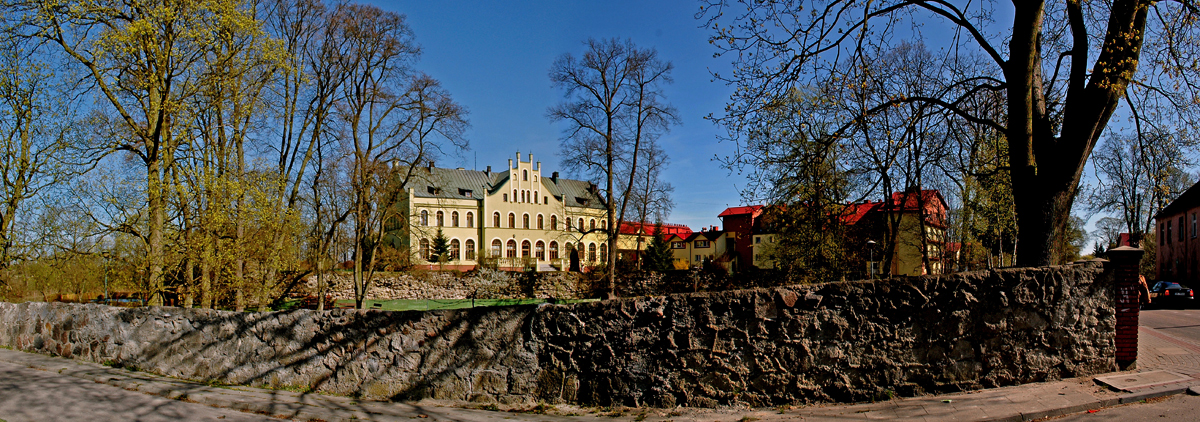
Remains of the castle

The area formed part of Poland until the Teutonic invasion in 1309. Konrad von Jungingen granted the settlement town privileges in 1395. It lay on the bank of the Czarna river, hence its name. It was an important trade and military point due to the nearby Teutonic Order and Pomeranian frontier. In 1454 the town and region were reincorporated to Poland by King Casimir IV Jagiellon. Afterwards the castle and town were defended against Teutonic attacks. Following the Thirteen Years' War, according to the Second Peace of Thorn (1466), it was confirmed as part of Poland. Since then the town was part of the Pomeranian Voivodeship in the Polish province of Royal Prussia, and later also in the Greater Poland Province. Czarne was the seat of the starosts (local royal administrators), they resided in the local castle. In 1627, it was site of the Battle of Czarne, in which Poles under the command of Stanisław Koniecpolski defeated the invading Swedes.

After the First Partition of Poland in 1772 the town was annexed by Prussia. It became part of the newly established Province of West Prussia in 1773. Prussian authorities ordered the demolition of the Czarne castle. The town was captured by Poles in 1807, during the Napoleonic Wars and Polish national liberation fights. A railway line from Chojnice via Czarne to Szczecinek was opened in 1878. In 1885 the Prussian Army built a large training ground (Übungsplatz) there.

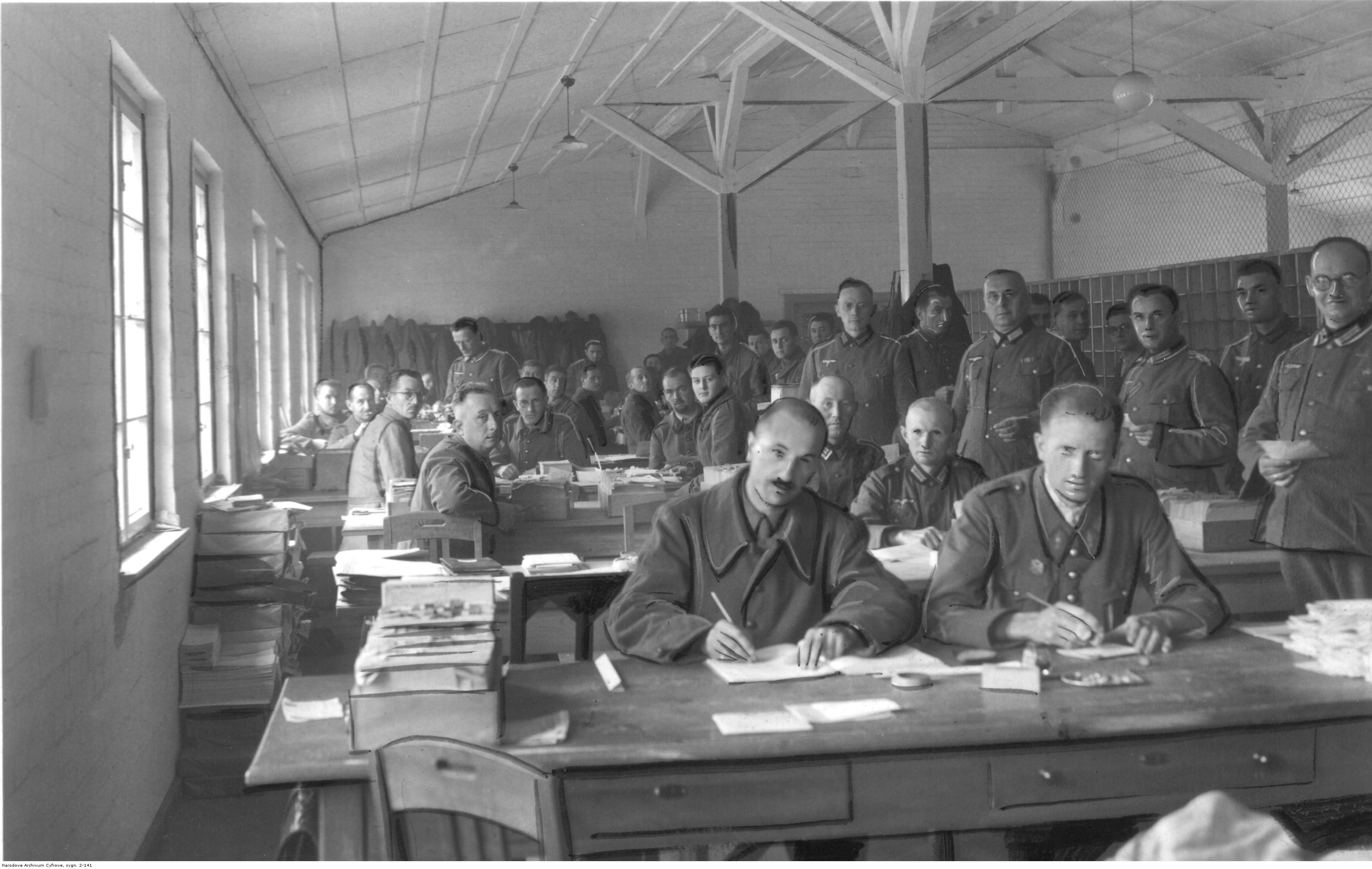
Polish prisoners of war and German guards at the Stalag II-B POW camp during World War II

In World War I the German Army used it for a large prisoner-of-war camp for Russian POWs, including ethnic Polish conscripts from the Russian Partition of Poland. After the war, the former camp housed German civilians fleeing Soviet Russia and Poles so that they would be prevented from participating in the Greater Poland uprising of 1918–1919 and joining the nascent Polish army. Many stayed, thus in 1920, about 25% of the residents were immigrants.

In 1933, a Nazi concentration camp was established in the town, which was later converted into a training center for police forces of Nazi Germany and SA. In World War II it was the site of the notorious Stalag II-B POW camp in which initially Polish POWs were held, and later also French, Belgian, Serbian, American, Soviet and Italian POWs, and Polish civilians from Soviet captivity mistakenly classified as POWs, of which tens of thousands, mainly Soviets, died from disease, mistreatment and malnutrition. From June to October 1941, the town was the location of another camp, the Stalag II F for Polish, French and Soviet POWs, before its relocation to Przemyśl. In 1945, with the defeat of Nazi Germany, the town became again part of Poland under the terms of the post-war Potsdam Agreement. Afterwards, Poles displaces from Soviet-annexed eastern Poland settled in Czarne, and since 1951 it hosts a garrison of the Polish Army.

== Transport ==
Czarne is located at the intersection of Voivodeship roads 201 and 202, and there is also a railway station.

== Sports ==
The local football club is Czarni Czarne. It competes in the lower leagues.

== Notable residents ==
- Rudolf Hellgrewe (1860–1935), landscape painter and illustrator
- Alexander Beer (1873–1944), architect
- Henryk Moruś (1943–2013), convicted serial killer
