= Dąbrowa Człuchowska =

- Village
- Location within Poland
- Coordinates: 53°48′44″N 17°17′48″E
- Country: Poland
- Voivodeship: Pomeranian
- County: Człuchów
- Gmina: Przechlewo
- Population: 286

Dąbrowa Człuchowska [dɔmˈbrɔva t͡ʂwuˈxɔfska] (German: Damerau) is a village in the administrative district of Gmina Przechlewo, within Człuchów County, Pomeranian Voivodeship, in northern Poland.

For details of the history of the region, see History of Pomerania.
