= Wierzbnik, Pomeranian Voivodeship =

Wierzbnik
- Settlement
- Location within Poland
- Coordinates: 53°40′30″N 16°58′39″E
- Country: Poland
- Voivodeship: Pomeranian
- County: Człuchów
- Gmina: Czarne
- Population: 5

Wierzbnik [ˈvjɛʐbnik] is a settlement in the administrative district of Gmina Czarne, within Człuchów County, Pomeranian Voivodeship, in Northern Poland.

For details of the history of the region, see History of Pomerania.
