= Domyśl =

- Settlement
- Location within Poland
- Coordinates: 53°36′59″N 16°55′15″E
- Country: Poland
- Voivodeship: Pomeranian
- County: Człuchów
- Gmina: Czarne

Population
  - Total: 1
- Time zone: UTC+1 (CET)
  - Summer (DST): UTC+2 (CEST)
- Vehicle registration: GCZ

Domyśl [ˈdɔmɨɕl] is a settlement in the administrative district of Gmina Czarne, within Człuchów County, Pomeranian Voivodeship, in northern Poland.

It was part of the Kingdom of Poland until the First Partition of Poland (1772), when it was annexed by the Kingdom of Prussia. From 1871 it formed part of the German Empire, and following Germany's defeat in World War II it became again part of Poland.
