= Battle of Czarne =

1627 battle

- Part of the Polish–Swedish War (1626–1629)
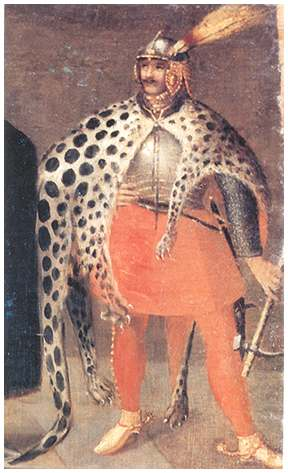
- Hussar from c. 1600–25
Date	April 12–17, 1627
Location	Czarne (Hammerstein), Poland
Result	Polish–Lithuanian victory

Belligerents
Polish–Lithuanian Commonwealth	Swedish Empire

Commanders and leaders
Stanisław Koniecpolski	von Launstein; Maximilian Teuffel von Kötteritz

Strength
About 3,000	About 2,500: 1,000 cavalry and 1,500 infantry

Casualties and losses
Unknown	Unknown

The Battle of Czarne, (Note: Also known as the Battle of Hammerstein or Hamersztyn) 12 to 17 April 1627, took place during the Polish–Swedish War (1626–1629) around Czarne in Poland. A Polish–Lithuanian Commonwealth army under Stanisław Koniecpolski confronted a Swedish force led by von Lauenstein, Maximilian Teuffel, and von Kötteritz.

Largely composed of unpaid German mercenaries, the Swedish troops mutinied and forced their leaders to surrender. Many subsequently switched sides.

== Background ==
In January 1627 Axel Oxenstierna developed a plan to destroy the Polish forces by flanking them from east and west. The western component was to come from new recruits in Germany; their recruitment however was significantly delayed, and eventually ordered by Gustavus II Adolphus to march for Poland before they reached the planned strength of 5,000. They numbered about 1,000 reiter cavalry, 1,500 infantry, and eight artillery pieces. Initially this put Polish forces under Field Crown Hetman Stanisław Koniecpolski in a difficult position, but eventually the German mercenary forces under Johann Streiff (commanding the cavalry) and Maximilian Teuffel were separated from the main Swedish forces on March 20, surprised by the flooding of the Vistula which made crossing the river impossible in most places. They considered retreating to Puck but Koniecpolski with 3,000 troops besieged it and the Swedes surrendered on April 2 before Streiff and Teuffel could arrive. Streiff and Teuffel decided to move towards Gniewno, through Czarne (Hammerstein) and Człuchów (Schlochau). They reached Czarne around 10 or 11 April, but were surprised to realize then that the Polish forces of Koniecpolski were very close, in Człuchów. They attempted to break through Debrzno, but were repulsed by the Polish forces. Surrounded from most sides, and slightly reinforced by the rear guard under Johan Friedrich von Kötteritz, the Swedes begun fortifying their positions, preparing for a siege.

== Battle ==
At the time of the battle, the Swedes, not counting a unit under Kötteritz which garrisoned a nearby crossing at Gwda Wielka, numbered about 1,700–1,800. Koniecpolski had only about 1,200–1,300 under his command, but ordered his units to advance on 12 April. The Swedish field fortifications were not finished, and the Poles were able to break through the Swedish cavalry trying to protect them; however, they were turned back by infantry fire. A second Polish attack that day, with infantry support, also did not manage to defeat the Swedes. By 13 April Polish reinforcements had arrived, giving Koniecpolski a slight numerical superiority. By 13 April the morale of the Swedish troops began weakening, and increasingly, there was talk about surrender. This began impacting the activity of Swedish troops, likely nullifying some planned raids outside their fortifications. Some negotiations began on April 14, but were futile, and another Polish assault on April 15, while not fully successful, caused a mutiny in the Swedish camp, and eventually Streiff and Teuffel were arrested by their soldiers. Negotiation ensued, mostly concluded and signed on April 16, with an official ceremony on August 17.

The Swedish infantry was to join the Polish army, the reiters were to swear never to fight against the Polish king, with volunteers also allowed to join the Polish army, and the Swedish loot from nearby lands was to be returned to the owners (this caused some annoyance within the Polish army, whose soldiers preferred to continue fighting to take the loot for themselves). Eventually, about 500 reiters and 800 infantry joined the Polish army; about 250 reiters left for the Polish borders.

== Aftermath ==
Koniecpolski then turned his army to advance against the main Swedish army of Axel Oxenstierna.

The Polish victory, although only on a sideline of the major front of the war, had significant repercussions. It increased the morale of Poland and its allies; motivating Gdańsk (Danzig) forces to advance towards Głowa, the Elector of Brandenburg to officially ally himself with Poland, Lithuania to renounce its own ceasefire with Sweden, and other foreign powers supporting Sweden at that time (Ottomans and Russia) to become less aggressive.

With regard to the tactical situation, Koniecpolski managed to destroy most Swedish activity on the western bank of the Vistula, and limited their presence to only the eastern bank. He also reinforced his own army, preventing the Swedes from achieving the quick victory they desired.
