= Wygonki =

- Settlement
- Location within Poland
- Coordinates: 53°38′0″N 17°6′15″E
- Country: Poland
- Voivodeship: Pomeranian
- County: Człuchów
- Gmina: Czarne
- Population: 2

Wygonki [vɨˈɡɔnki] is a settlement in the administrative district of Gmina Czarne, within Człuchów County, Pomeranian Voivodeship, in northern Poland.

For details of the history of the region, see History of Pomerania.
