= Pawłówko, Człuchów County =

Pawłówko
- Village
- Location within Poland
- Coordinates: 53°44′21″N 17°16′49″E
- Country: Poland
- Voivodeship: Pomeranian
- County: Człuchów
- Gmina: Przechlewo
- Population: 242

Pawłówko [paˈvwufkɔ] is a village in the administrative district of Gmina Przechlewo, within Człuchów County, Pomeranian Voivodeship, in northern Poland.

For details of the history of the region, see History of Pomerania.
