= Nowa Wieś Człuchowska railway station =

Railway station in Nowa Wieś Człuchowska, Poland

Nowa Wieś Człuchowska

General information
- Location: Nowa Wieś Człuchowska; Poland
- Owner: Polskie Koleje Państwowe S.A.

History
- Former names: Neuguth
Location

Nowa Wieś Człuchowska is a former PKP railway station in Nowa Wieś Człuchowska (Pomeranian Voivodeship), Poland.
