= Sierpowo, Pomeranian Voivodeship =

Sierpowo
- Village
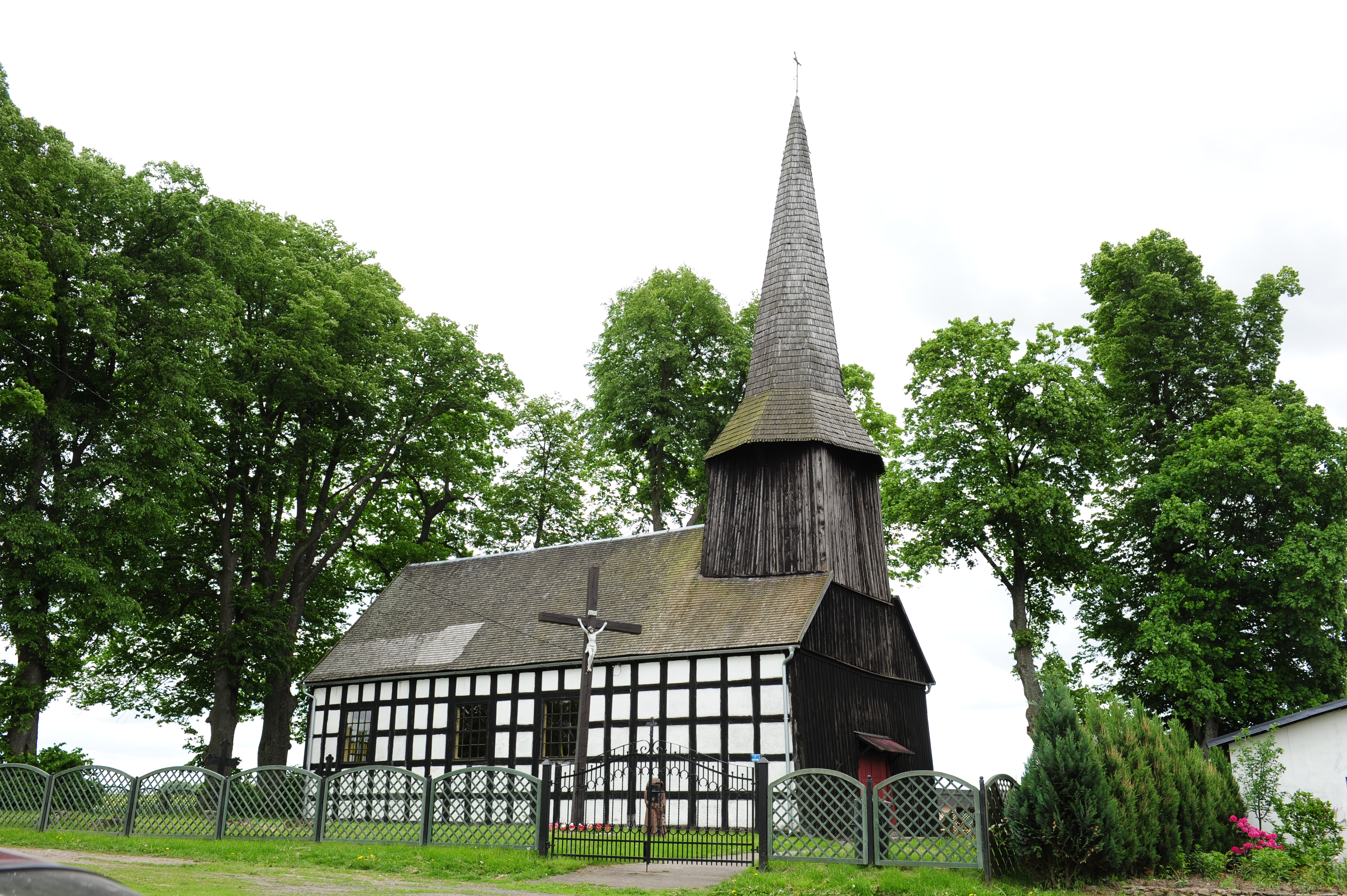
- Saint Jude Thaddeus church in Sierpowo

- Location within Poland
- Coordinates: 53°37′48″N 16°58′42″E
- Country: Poland
- Voivodeship: Pomeranian
- County: Człuchów
- Gmina: Czarne
- Population: 187
- Time zone: UTC+1 (CET)
  - Summer (DST): UTC+2 (CEST)

Sierpowo [ɕɛrˈpɔvɔ] (German: Breitenfelde) is a village in the administrative district of Gmina Czarne, within Człuchów County, Pomeranian Voivodeship, in northern Poland. It is located within the historic region of Pomerania.

Sierpowo was a private village within the Polish Crown, owned by various Polish nobles, administratively located in the Człuchów County in the Pomeranian Voivodeship. During World War II the German administration operated a labor camp for prisoners of war from the Stalag II-B prisoner-of-war camp in the village.

The landmark of Sierpowo is the timber framed Saint Jude Thaddeus church, built in the 17th century.
