= Zawada, Człuchów County =

Zawada
- Village
- Location within Poland
- Coordinates: 53°46′28″N 17°13′3″E
- Country: Poland
- Voivodeship: Pomeranian
- County: Człuchów
- Gmina: Przechlewo
- Population: 88

Zawada [zaˈvada] is a village in the administrative district of Gmina Przechlewo, within Człuchów County, Pomeranian Voivodeship, in northern Poland.

For details of the history of the region, see History of Pomerania.
