= Słosinko railway station =

Pomeranian Voivodeship, Poland railway station

Słosinko

General information
- Location: Słosinko; Poland
- Owner: Polskie Koleje Państwowe S.A.
- Line: 405: Piła Główna - Ustka Uroczysko; 413: Człuchów–Słosinko railway
- Platforms: 2

Construction
- Structure type: Building: Yes (no longer used); Depot: Never existed Water tower: Never existed

History
- Former names: Reinfeld (Pommern)

Services
Preceding station	Polregio	Following station
Biały Bór towards Szczecinek or Chojnice	PR	Miastko towards Słupsk
Biały Bór towards Runowo Pomorskie	PR	Miastko Terminus
Location

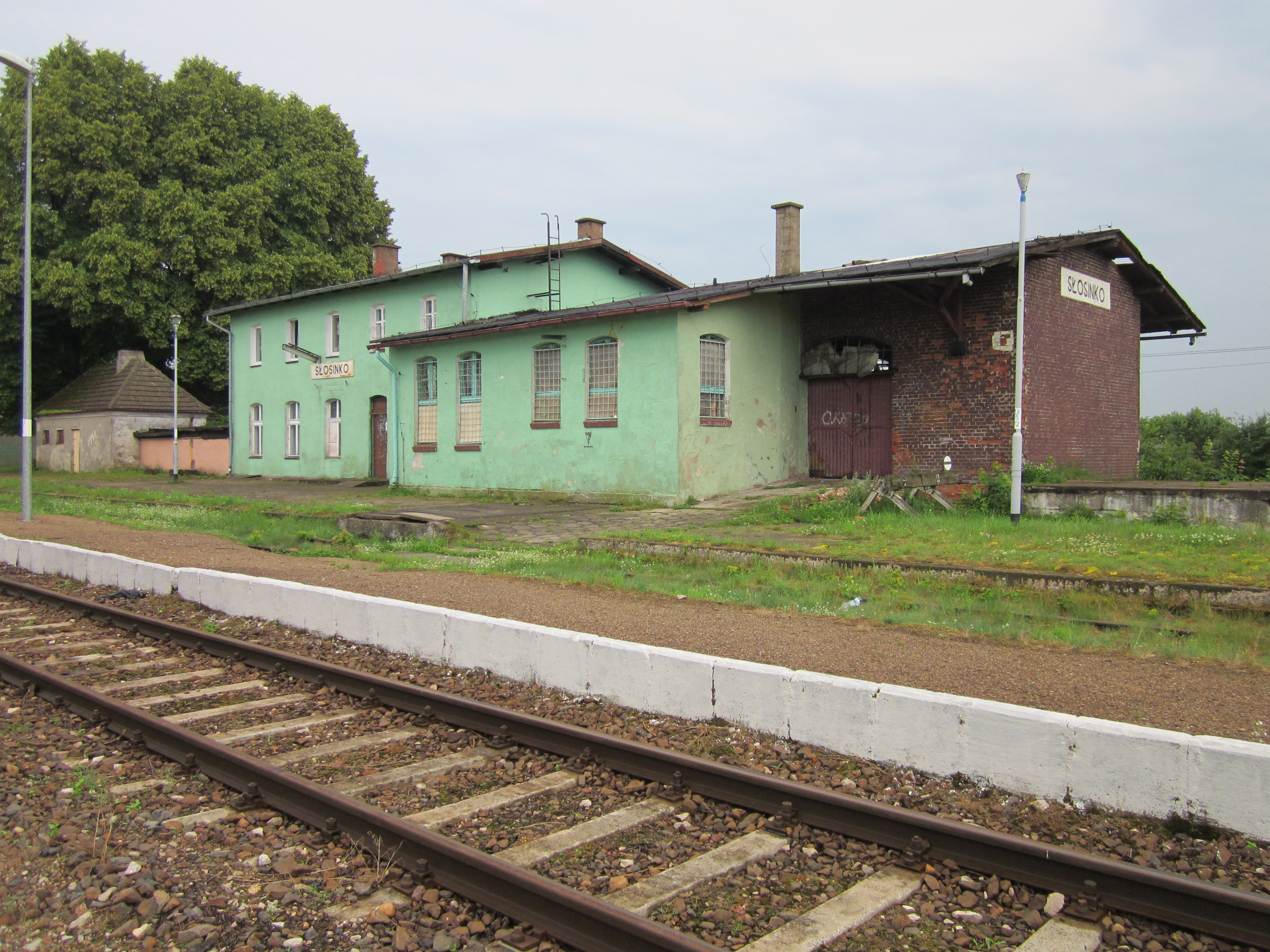

Słosinko is a PKP railway station in Słosinko (Pomeranian Voivodeship), Poland.

== Lines crossing the station ==
Start station	End station	Line type
Człuchów	Słosinko	Closed
Piła	Ustka	Passenger/Freight

== Train services ==
The station is served by the following services:

- Regional services (R) Słupsk — Miastko — Szczecinek
- Regional services (R) Słupsk — Miastko — Szczecinek — Chojnice
- Regional services (R) Miastko — Szczecinek — Runowo Pomorskie
