= Lędyczek Drugi =

- Settlement
- Location within Poland
- Coordinates: 53°35′19″N 16°59′32″E
- Country: Poland
- Voivodeship: Pomeranian
- County: Człuchów
- Gmina: Czarne
- Population: 6

Lędyczek Drugi [lɛnˈdɨt͡ʂɛk ˈdruɡi] is a settlement in the administrative district of Gmina Czarne, within Człuchów County, Pomeranian Voivodeship, in northern Poland.

For details of the history of the region, see History of Pomerania.
