= Nadziejewo, Pomeranian Voivodeship =

Nadziejewo
- Village
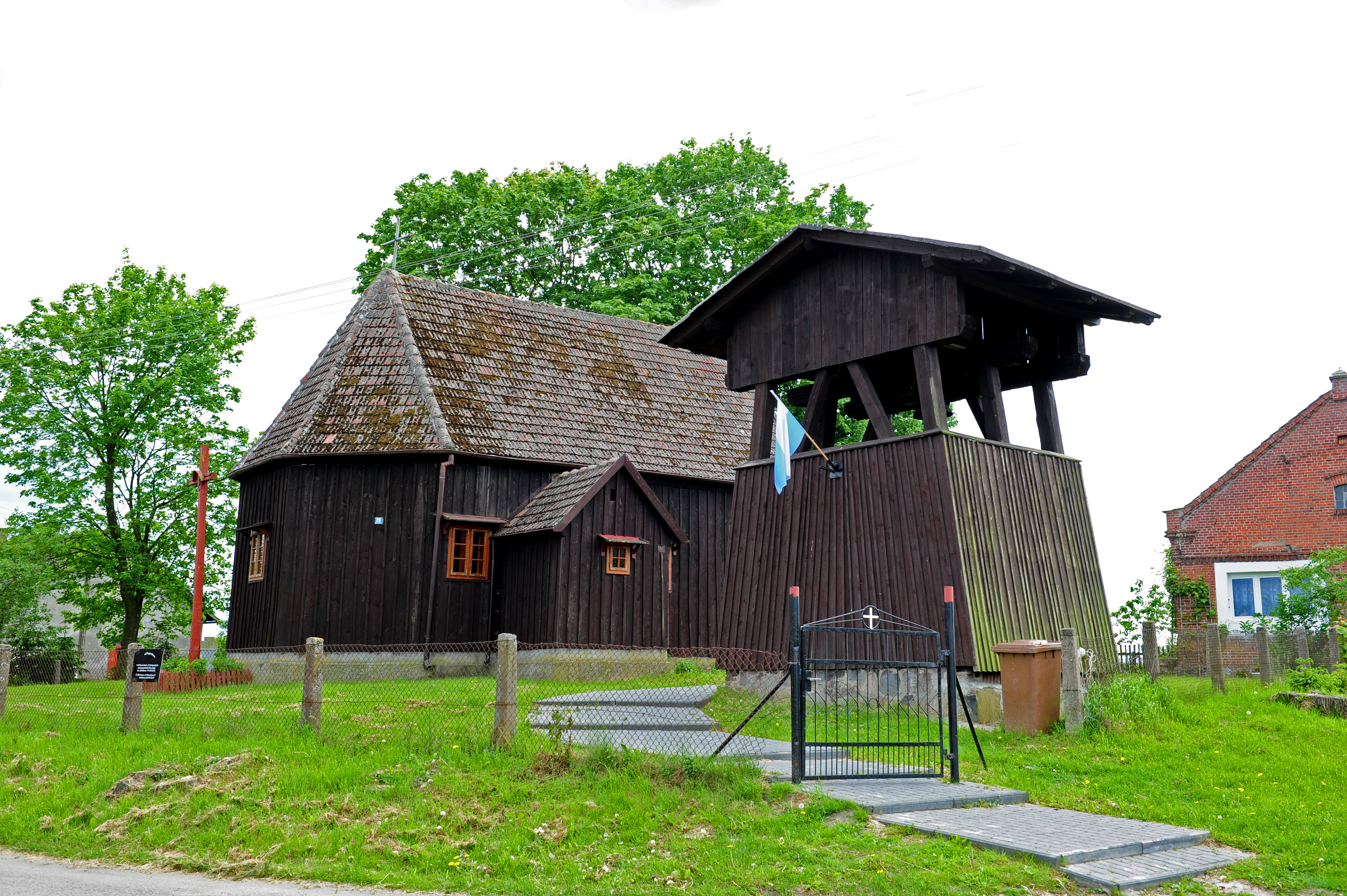
- Historic wooden Saint Andrew church in Nadziejewo

- Location within Poland
- Coordinates: 53°41′1″N 17°0′11″E
- Country: Poland
- Voivodeship: Pomeranian
- County: Człuchów
- Gmina: Czarne
- Population: 183
- Time zone: UTC+1 (CET)
  - Summer (DST): UTC+2 (CEST)

Nadziejewo [nad͡ʑɛˈjɛvɔ] is a village in the administrative district of Gmina Czarne, within Człuchów County, Pomeranian Voivodeship, in northern Poland. It is located within the historic region of Pomerania.

Nadziejewo was a royal village of the Polish Crown, administratively located in the Człuchów County in the Pomeranian Voivodeship. During World War II the German administration operated a labor camp for prisoners of war from the Stalag II-B prisoner-of-war camp in the village.
