= Miastko railway station =

Railway station in Miastko, Poland

Miastko
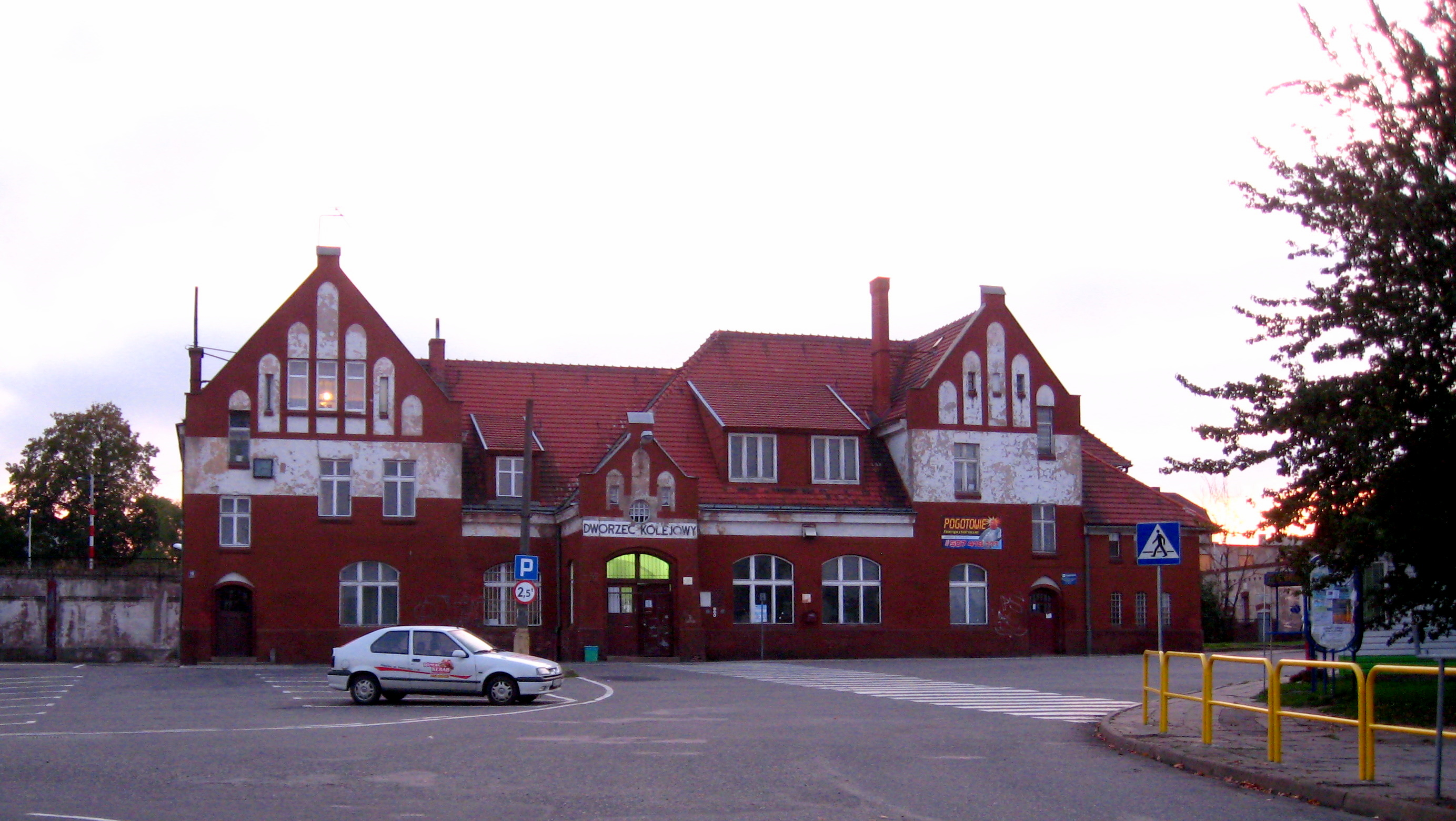
- Miastko railway station

General information
- Location: Miastko; Poland
- Owner: Polskie Koleje Państwowe S.A.
- Line: 405: Piła Główna - Ustka Uroczysko
- Platforms: 2

Construction
- Structure type: Building: Yes; Depot: Yes (no longer used); Water tower: Yes

History
- Former names: Rummelsburg (Pommern)

Services
Preceding station	Polregio	Following station
Terminus	PR	Kawcze towards Słupsk
Słosinko towards Szczecinek or Chojnice	PR	Kawcze towards Słupsk
Słosinko towards Runowo Pomorskie	PR	Terminus
Location

Miastko is a PKP railway station in Miastko (Pomeranian Voivodeship), Poland.

== Lines crossing the station ==
Start station	End station	Line type
Bytów	Miastko	Dismantled
Piła	Ustka	Passenger/Freight

== Train services ==
The station is served by the following services:

- Regional services (R) Słupsk — Miastko
- Regional services (R) Słupsk — Miastko — Szczecinek
- Regional services (R) Słupsk — Miastko — Szczecinek — Chojnice
- Regional services (R) Miastko — Szczecinek — Runowo Pomorskie
