= Jemielno, Człuchów County =

Jemielno
- Village
- Location within Poland
- Coordinates: 53°47′7″N 17°19′53″E
- Country: Poland
- Voivodeship: Pomeranian
- County: Człuchów
- Gmina: Przechlewo

Jemielno [jɛˈmjɛlnɔ] is a village in the administrative district of Gmina Przechlewo, within Człuchów County, Pomeranian Voivodeship, in northern Poland.

For details of the history of the region, see History of Pomerania.

== Notable residents ==
- Karl-Eric Bertram (1903–1945), Luftwaffe officer
