= Sokole, Pomeranian Voivodeship =

Sokole
- Village
- Location within Poland
- Coordinates: 53°39′24″N 16°58′44″E
- Country: Poland
- Voivodeship: Pomeranian
- County: Człuchów
- Gmina: Czarne
- Population: 121
- Time zone: UTC+1 (CET)
  - Summer (DST): UTC+2 (CEST)
- Vehicle registration: GCZ

Sokole [sɔˈkɔlɛ] is a village in the administrative district of Gmina Czarne, within Człuchów County, Pomeranian Voivodeship, in northern Poland. It is located within the historic region of Pomerania.

Sokole was a royal village of the Polish Crown, administratively located in the Człuchów County in the Pomeranian Voivodeship.
