= Żołna, Pomeranian Voivodeship =

Żołna
- Village
- Location within Poland
- Coordinates: 53°54′25″N 17°14′36″E
- Country: Poland
- Voivodeship: Pomeranian
- County: Człuchów
- Gmina: Przechlewo

Żołna [ˈʐɔu̯na] (German: Eisenbrück) is a village in the administrative district of Gmina Przechlewo, within Człuchów County, Pomeranian Voivodeship, in northern Poland.

For details of the history of the region, see History of Pomerania.
