= Wierzchowo Człuchowskie railway station =

Railway station in Kuyavian-Pomeranian Voivodeship, Poland

Coordinates: 53°37′05″N 17°26′51″E

Wierzchowo Człuchowskie
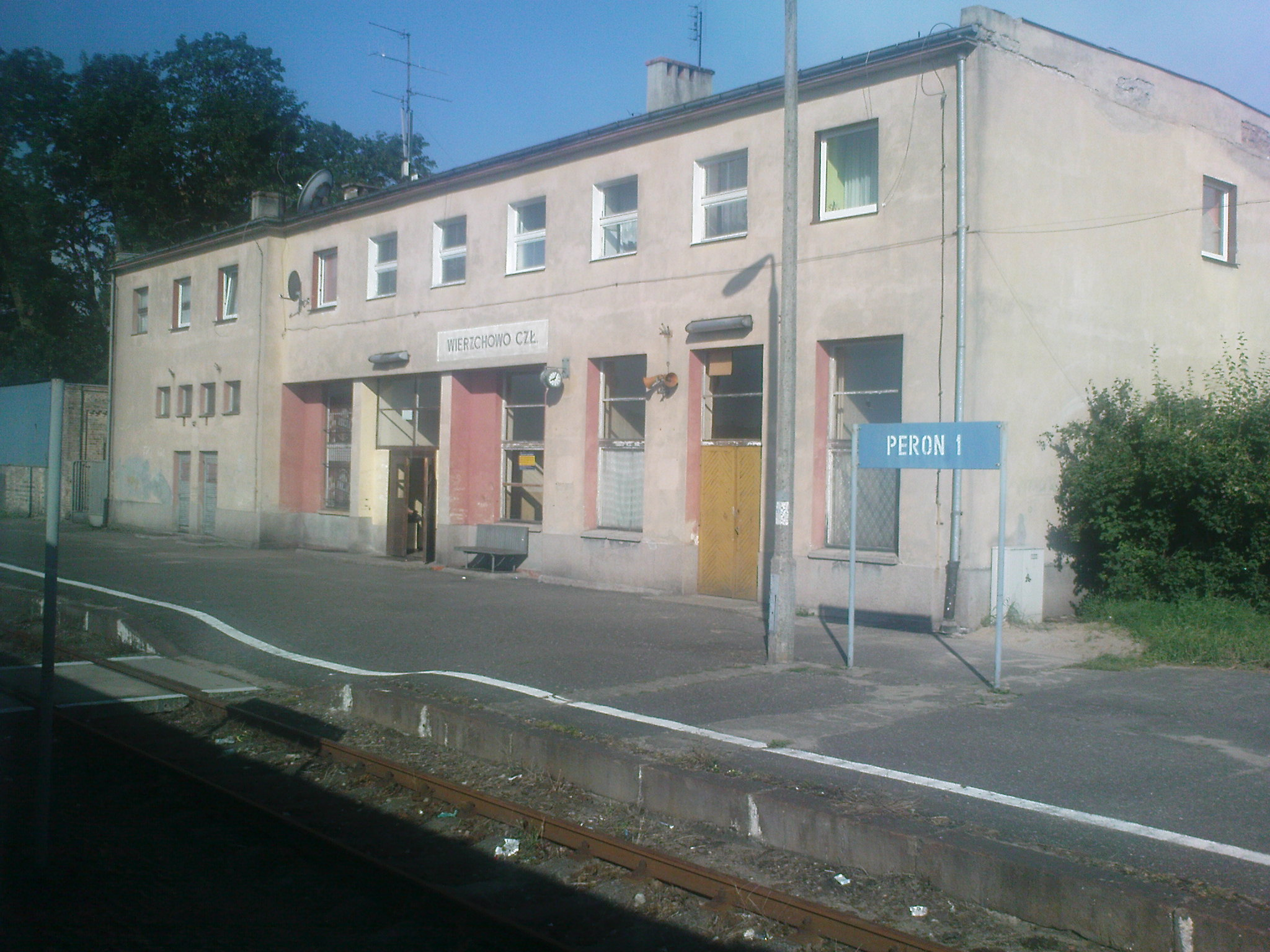

General information
- Location: Wierzchowo Człuchowskie; Poland
- Owner: Polskie Koleje Państwowe S.A.
- Platforms: 2

Construction
- Structure type: Building: Yes; Depot: Yes (no longer used); Water tower: No

History
- Former names: Firchau
Location

Wierzchowo Człuchowskie is a PKP railway station in Wierzchowo Człuchowskie (Pomeranian Voivodeship), Poland.

== Lines crossing the station ==
Start station	End station	Line type
Tczew	Küstrin Kietz	Passenger/Freight
Brzeźno Człuchowskie	Wierzchowo Człuchowskie	Dismantled
