= Jarzębnik, Pomeranian Voivodeship =

Jarzębnik
- Settlement
- Location within Poland
- Coordinates: 53°52′4″N 17°19′7″E
- Country: Poland
- Voivodeship: Pomeranian
- County: Człuchów
- Gmina: Przechlewo
- Population: 45

Jarzębnik [jaˈʐɛmbnik] is a settlement in the administrative district of Gmina Przechlewo, within Człuchów County, Pomeranian Voivodeship, in northern Poland.

For details of the history of the region, see History of Pomerania.
