= Krzemieniewo, Pomeranian Voivodeship =

Krzemieniewo
- Village
- Location within Poland
- Coordinates: 53°36′24″N 17°0′38″E
- Country: Poland
- Voivodeship: Pomeranian
- County: Człuchów
- Gmina: Czarne
- Population: 589

Krzemieniewo (Polish pronunciation: [kʂɛmjɛˈɲɛvɔ]) is a village in the administrative district of Gmina Czarne, within Człuchów County, Pomeranian Voivodeship, in northern Poland.

The village has a church dating from 1629.

Krzemieniewo was the site of subcamp Krummensee of the Nazi Stutthof concentration camp near Danzig during the Third Reich.
