= Chojnice–Runowo Pomorskie railway =

Railway line in Poland

Chojnice–Runowo Pomorskie
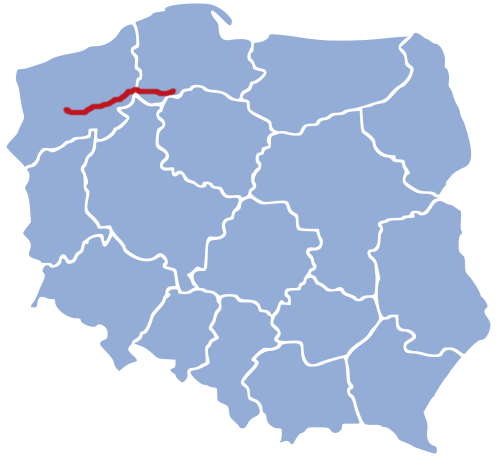

Overview
- Status: in use
- Locale: Poland
- Termini: Chojnice; Runowo Pomorskie
- Stations: 25

Service
- Type: Heavy rail
- Services: 2
- Route number: 210
- Operator: PKP PLK

History
- Opened: 1878

Technical
- Line length: 149.365 km (92.811 mi)
- Track gauge: 1,435 mm (4 ft 8 1/2 in)
- Electrification: No
- Operating speed: 80 km/h (50 mph)

The Chojnice–Runowo Pomorskie railway is a Polish 149-kilometre long railway line, that connects Chojnice with Szczecinek and Runowo Pomorskie. The line lies in the Pomeranian and West Pomeranian Voivodship.

== History ==
Ruhnow-Konitz, originally Central Pomeranian Railway, since 1875 Prussian State Railways, see also Prussian Eastern Railway.

== Stations on the line ==
Listed from east to west:

Station	Line km	Status
Chojnice	0.0 km	Active
Brzeźno Człuchowskie	7.125 km	Active
Człuchów	14.746 km	Active
Biskupnica	25.930 km	Active
Bińcze	31.490 km	Active
Domisław	38.507 km	Active
Czarne	45.199 km	Active
Żółtnica	53.693 km	Active
Czarnobór	56.738 km	Active
Szczecinek	61.184	Active
Jelenino	67.743 km	Active
Silnowo	77.755 km	Active
Łubowo	86.924 km	Active
Czarne Małe	92.429 km	Active
Czaplinek	98.233	Active
Żelisławie Pom.	105.424 km	Active
Bobrowo Pom.	109.829 km	Active
Złocieniec	113.787 km	Active
Rzęśnica	118.335 km	Active
Suliszewo Drawskie	122.309	Active
Drawsko Pom.	127.013 km	Active
Jankowo Pom.	130.447 km	Active
Wiewiecko	139.109 km	Active
Węgorzyno	145.214 km	Active
Runowo Pom.	149.365 km	Active
