= Płaszczyca =

- Village
- Location within Poland
- Coordinates: 53°46′48″N 17°19′38″E
- Country: Poland
- Voivodeship: Pomeranian
- County: Człuchów
- Gmina: Przechlewo
- Population: 369
- Time zone: UTC+1 (CET)
  - Summer (DST): UTC+2 (CEST)

Płaszczyca [pwaʂˈt͡ʂɨt͡sa] (German: Platzig) is a village in the administrative district of Gmina Przechlewo, within Człuchów County, Pomeranian Voivodeship, in northern Poland. It is located within the historic region of Pomerania.

Płaszczyca was a private village within the Polish Crown, administratively located in the Człuchów County in the Pomeranian Voivodeship, owned by the Polish noble family of Ciecholewski in the 16th century. It was annexed by Prussia during the First Partition of Poland in 1772, and from 1871 to 1945 it was also part of Germany, under the name Platzig. During World War II the German administration operated a labor camp for prisoners of war from the Stalag II-B prisoner-of-war camp in the village.
