= Malinowo, Pomeranian Voivodeship =

Malinowo
- Settlement
- Location within Poland
- Coordinates: 53°37′11″N 17°2′2″E
- Country: Poland
- Voivodeship: Pomeranian
- County: Człuchów
- Gmina: Czarne
- Population: 15

Malinowo [maliˈnɔvɔ] is a settlement in the administrative district of Gmina Czarne, within Człuchów County, Pomeranian Voivodeship, in northern Poland.

For details of the history of the region, see History of Pomerania.
