= Czosnowo railway station =

Railway station in Poland

Coordinates: 53.7942°N 17.3658°E

Czosnowo

General information
- Location: Czosnowo; Poland
- Owner: Polskie Koleje Państwowe S.A.

Construction
- Structure type: Building: Yes (no longer used); Depot: Never existed Water tower: Pulled down

History
- Former names: Ulrichsdorf
Location
- Location within Pomeranian Voivodeship Location within Poland

Czosnowo is a former PKP railway station in Czosnowo (Pomeranian Voivodeship), Poland.
