= Raciniewo, Pomeranian Voivodeship =

Raciniewo
- Village
- Location within Poland
- Coordinates: 53°40′26″N 17°3′33″E
- Country: Poland
- Voivodeship: Pomeranian
- County: Człuchów
- Gmina: Czarne
- Population: 109

Raciniewo [rat͡ɕiˈɲɛvɔ] is a village in the administrative district of Gmina Czarne, within Człuchów County, Pomeranian Voivodeship, in northern Poland.

For details of the history of the region, see History of Pomerania.
