= Prądy, Pomeranian Voivodeship =

Prądy
- Settlement
- Location within Poland
- Coordinates: 53°32′48″N 16°57′13″E
- Country: Poland
- Voivodeship: Pomeranian
- County: Człuchów
- Gmina: Czarne
- Population: 11

Prądy [ˈprɔndɨ] is a settlement in the administrative district of Gmina Czarne, within Człuchów County, Pomeranian Voivodeship, in northern Poland.

For details of the history of the region, see History of Pomerania.
