= Przechlewko-Leśniczówka =

- Settlement
- Location within Poland
- Coordinates: 53°50′20″N 17°14′50″E
- Country: Poland
- Voivodeship: Pomeranian
- County: Człuchów
- Gmina: Przechlewo
- Population: 2

Przechlewko-Leśniczówka (Polish pronunciation: [pʂɛˈxlɛfkɔ lɛɕɲiˈtʂufka]) is a settlement in the administrative district of Gmina Przechlewo, within Człuchów County, Pomeranian Voivodeship, in northern Poland.

For details of the history of the region, see History of Pomerania.
