= Łubianka, Pomeranian Voivodeship =

Łubianka
- Village
- Location within Poland
- Coordinates: 53°49′33″N 17°14′29″E
- Country: Poland
- Voivodeship: Pomeranian
- County: Człuchów
- Gmina: Przechlewo
- Population: 55

Łubianka [wuˈbjanka] is a village in the administrative district of Gmina Przechlewo, within Człuchów County, Pomeranian Voivodeship, in northern Poland.

For details of the history of the region, see History of Pomerania.
