= Nowa Brda railway station =

Railway station in Nowa Brda, Poland

Coordinates: 53.8739°N 17.2175°E

Nowa Brda

General information
- Location: Nowa Brda; Poland
- Owner: Polskie Koleje Państwowe S.A.

Construction
- Structure type: Building: Yes (no longer used); Depot: Never existed Water tower: Never existed

History
- Former names: Neubrda
Location

Nowa Brda is a former PKP railway station in Nowa Brda (Pomeranian Voivodeship), Poland.
