= Koprzywnica, Człuchów County =

Koprzywnica
- Village
- Location within Poland
- Coordinates: 53°46′31″N 17°10′27″E
- Country: Poland
- Voivodeship: Pomeranian
- County: Człuchów
- Gmina: Przechlewo
- Population: 0

Koprzywnica [kɔpʂɨvˈnit͡sa] is a former village in the administrative district of Gmina Przechlewo, within Człuchów County, Pomeranian Voivodeship, in northern Poland.

For details of the history of the region, see History of Pomerania.
