= Szyszka, Pomeranian Voivodeship =

Szyszka
- Settlement
- Location within Poland
- Coordinates: 53°55′42″N 17°12′16″E
- Country: Poland
- Voivodeship: Pomeranian
- County: Człuchów
- Gmina: Przechlewo
- Population: 4

Szyszka [ˈʂɨʂka] is a settlement in the administrative district of Gmina Przechlewo, within Człuchów County, Pomeranian Voivodeship, in northern Poland.

For details of the history of the region, see History of Pomerania.
