= Gmina Czarne =

Gmina Czarne Czarne Commune
- Gmina
- Coat of arms
- Interactive map of Gmina Czarne
- Coordinates (Czarne): 53°41′N 16°57′E
- Country: Poland
- Voivodeship: Pomeranian
- County: Człuchów
- Seat: Czarne

Area
  - Total: 234.9 km^{2} (90.7 sq mi)

Population (2022)
  - Total: 8,333
  - Density: 35.47/km^{2} (91.88/sq mi)
  - Urban: 5,368
  - Rural: 2,965

Gmina Czarne is an urban-rural gmina (administrative district) in Człuchów County, Pomeranian Voivodeship, in northern Poland. Its seat is the town of Czarne, which lies approximately 28 kilometres (17 mi) west of Człuchów and 134 km (83 mi) south-west of the regional capital Gdańsk.

The gmina covers an area of 234.9 square kilometres (90.7 sq mi), and as of 2022 its total population is 8,333 (out of which the population of Czarne amounts to 5,368, and the population of the rural part of the gmina is 2,965).

== Villages ==
Apart from the town of Czarne, Gmina Czarne contains the villages and settlements of Biernatka, Bińcze, Domisław, Domyśl, Grabowiec, Janowiec, Kijno, Krzemieniewo, Lędyczek Drugi, Łoża, Malinowo, Nadziejewo, Prądy, Raciniewo, Sierpowo, Sokole, Wierzbnik, Wronkowo, Wyczechy and Wygonki.

== Neighbouring gminas ==
Gmina Czarne is bordered by the gminas of Człuchów, Debrzno, Okonek, Rzeczenica and Szczecinek.
