= Dobrzyń, Pomeranian Voivodeship =

Dobrzyń
- Village
- Location within Poland
- Coordinates: 53°44′32″N 17°14′12″E
- Country: Poland
- Voivodeship: Pomeranian
- County: Człuchów
- Gmina: Przechlewo
- Population: 26

Dobrzyń ([ˈdɔbʐɨɲ]; German: Seehof) is a village in the administrative district of Gmina Przechlewo, within Człuchów County, Pomeranian Voivodeship, in northern Poland.

For details of the history of the region, see History of Pomerania.
