= Wronkowo =

- Village
- Location within Poland
- Coordinates: 53°41′34″N 16°58′7″E
- Country: Poland
- Voivodeship: Pomeranian
- County: Człuchów
- Gmina: Czarne
- Population: 92

Wronkowo [vrɔnˈkɔvɔ] is a village in the administrative district of Gmina Czarne, within Człuchów County, Pomeranian Voivodeship, in northern Poland.

For details of the history of the region, see History of Pomerania.
