= Gmina Przechlewo =

Gmina Przechlewo Przechlewo Commune
- Gmina
- Flag Coat of arms
- Interactive map of Gmina Przechlewo
- Coordinates (Przechlewo): 53°48′1″N 17°15′11″E
- Country: Poland
- Voivodeship: Pomeranian
- County: Człuchów
- Seat: Przechlewo

Area
  - Total: 243.88 km^{2} (94.16 sq mi)

Population (2006)
  - Total: 6,158
  - Density: 25.25/km^{2} (65.40/sq mi)
- Website: https://www.przechlewo.pl

Gmina Przechlewo (Kashubian: Przechlewò) is a rural gmina (administrative district) in Człuchów County, Pomeranian Voivodeship, in northern Poland. Its seat is the village of Przechlewo, which lies approximately 19 kilometres (12 mi) north-west of Człuchów and 110 km (68 mi) south-west of the regional capital Gdańsk.

The gmina covers an area of 243.88 square kilometres (94.2 sq mi), and as of 2006 its total population is 6,158.

== Villages ==
Gmina Przechlewo contains the villages and settlements of Czosnowo, Dąbrowa Człuchowska, Dobrzyń, Dolinka, Garbek, Jarzębnik, Jemielno, Kleśnik, Koprzywnica, Krasne, Lipczynek, Lisewo, Łubianka, Miroszewo, Nowa Brda, Nowa Wieś Człuchowska, Nowiny, Pakotulsko, Pawłówko, Płaszczyca, Przechlewko, Przechlewko-Leśniczówka, Przechlewo, Rudniki, Sąpolno, Suszka, Szczytno, Szyszka, Trzęsacz, Wandzin, Wiśnica, Zawada, Zdrójki and Żołna.

== Neighbouring gminas ==
Gmina Przechlewo is bordered by the gminas of Człuchów, Koczała, Konarzyny, Lipnica and Rzeczenica.
