= Przechlewo railway station =

Railway station in Przechlewo, Poland

Coordinates: 53.7997°N 17.2669°E

Przechlewo

General information
- Location: Przechlewo; Poland
- Owner: Polskie Koleje Państwowe S.A.
- Platforms: 1

Construction
- Structure type: Building: Yes (no longer used); Depot: Never existed Water tower: Never existed

History
- Former names: Prechlau
Location

Przechlewo is a former PKP railway station in Przechlewo (Pomeranian Voivodeship), Poland.
