= Nowiny, Człuchów County =

Nowiny
- Settlement
- Location within Poland
- Coordinates: 53°44′1″N 17°19′17″E
- Country: Poland
- Voivodeship: Pomeranian
- County: Człuchów
- Gmina: Przechlewo
- Population: 8

Nowiny [nɔˈvinɨ] is a settlement in the administrative district of Gmina Przechlewo, within Człuchów County, Pomeranian Voivodeship, in northern Poland.

For details of the history of the region, see History of Pomerania.
