= Polnica railway station =

Railway station in Człuchów County, Poland

Coordinates: 53.7458°N 17.4092°E

Polnica

General information
- Location: Polnica; Poland
- Owner: Polskie Koleje Państwowe S.A.
- Platforms: 1

Construction
- Structure type: Building: Yes (no longer used); Depot: Never existed Water tower: Never existed

History
- Former names: Pollnitz
Location

Polnica is a former PKP railway station in Polnica (Pomeranian Voivodeship), Poland.
