= Nowa Wieś Człuchowska =

- Village
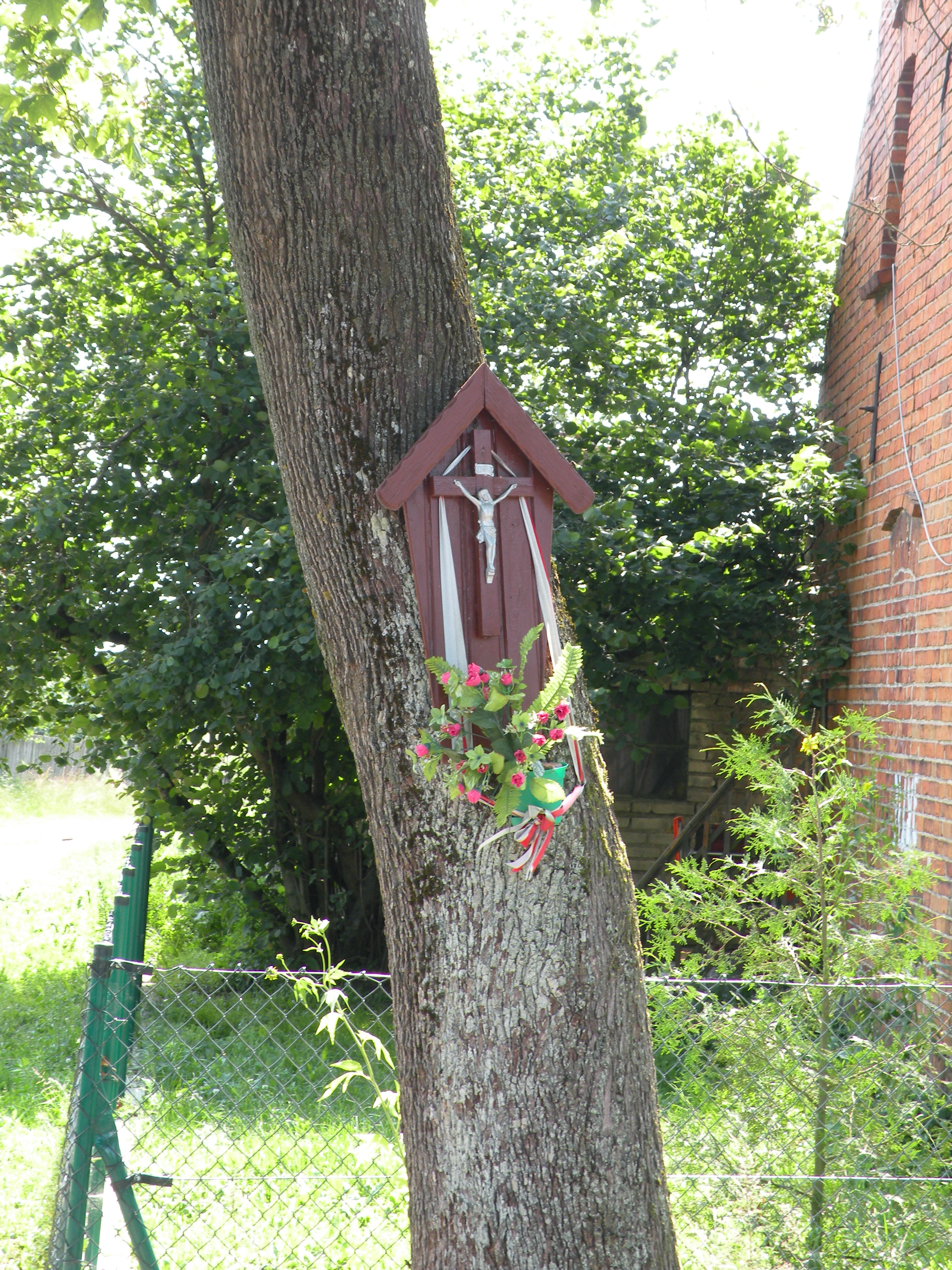

- Location within Poland
- Coordinates: 53°50′48″N 17°18′8″E
- Country: Poland
- Voivodeship: Pomeranian
- County: Człuchów
- Gmina: Przechlewo
- Population: 428
- Time zone: UTC+1 (CET)
  - Summer (DST): UTC+2 (CEST)
- Vehicle registration: GCZ

Nowa Wieś Człuchowska [ˈnɔva ˈvjɛɕ t͡ʂwuˈxɔfska] (German: Neuguth) is a village in the administrative district of Gmina Przechlewo, within Człuchów County, Pomeranian Voivodeship, in northern Poland. It is located within the ethnocultural region of Kashubia in the historic region of Pomerania.

Nowa Wieś Człuchowska was a royal village of the Polish Crown, administratively located in the Człuchów County in the Pomeranian Voivodeship.
