= Loza (Plzeň-North District) =

- Municipality
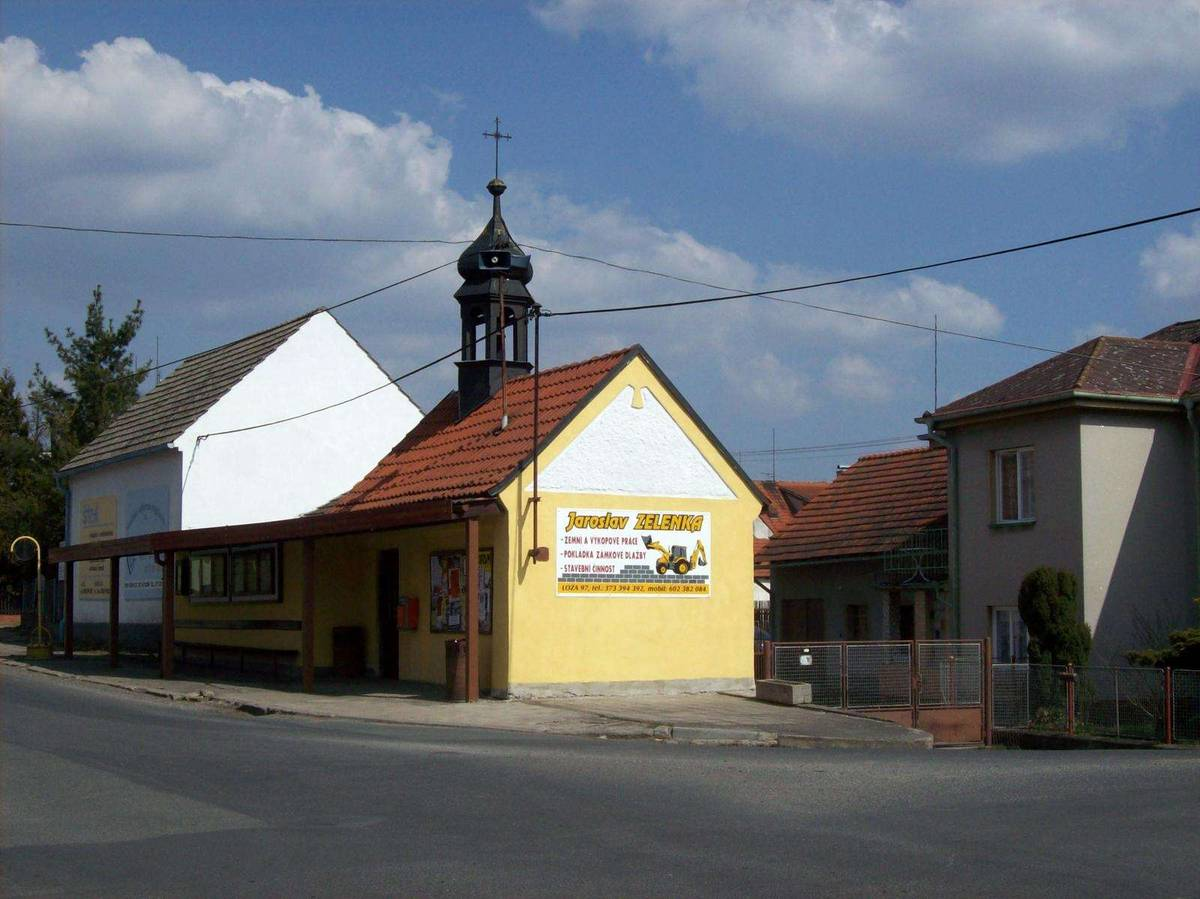
- Chapel in the centre of Loza

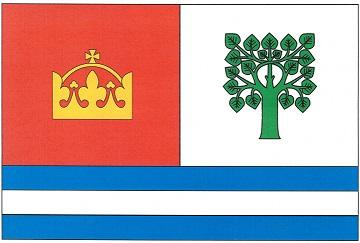
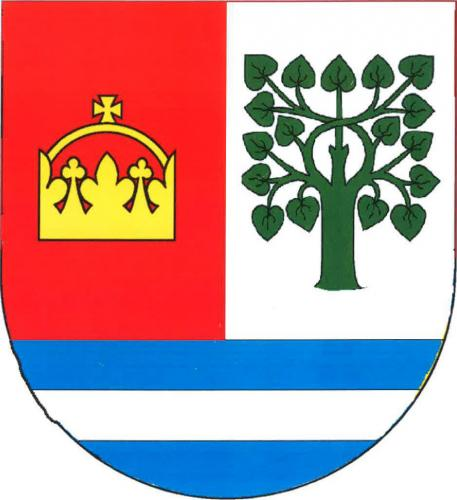
- Flag Coat of arms

- Location in the Czech Republic
- Coordinates: 49°53′38″N 13°17′26″E
- Country: Czech Republic
- Region: Plzeň
- District: Plzeň-North
- First mentioned: 1216

Area
  - Total: 3.72 km^{2} (1.44 sq mi)
- Elevation: 442 m (1,450 ft)

Population (2026-01-01)
  - Total: 255
  - Density: 68.5/km^{2} (178/sq mi)
- Time zone: UTC+1 (CET)
  - Summer (DST): UTC+2 (CEST)
- Postal code: 331 52
- Website: www.obec-loza.cz

Loza is a municipality and village in Plzeň-North District in the Plzeň Region of the Czech Republic. It has about 300 inhabitants.

Loza lies approximately 18 kilometres (11 mi) north of Plzeň and 84 km (52 mi) west of Prague.

== Demographics ==
Historical population
Year	Pop.	±%
1869	511	—
1880	328	−35.8%
1890	372	+13.4%
1900	357	−4.0%
1910	357	+0.0%
1921	367	+2.8%
1930	378	+3.0%
1950	314	−16.9%
1961	285	−9.2%
1970	284	−0.4%
1980	268	−5.6%
1991	260	−3.0%
2001	256	−1.5%
2011	259	+1.2%
2021	261	+0.8%
Source: Censuses
