= Czosnowo, Pomeranian Voivodeship =

Czosnowo
- Village
- Location within Poland
- Coordinates: 53°48′1″N 17°21′58″E
- Country: Poland
- Voivodeship: Pomeranian
- County: Człuchów
- Gmina: Przechlewo
- Population: 32

Czosnowo [t͡ʂɔsˈnɔvɔ] (German: Zossnow) is a village in the administrative district of Gmina Przechlewo, within Człuchów County, Pomeranian Voivodeship, in northern Poland.

For details of the history of the region, see History of Pomerania.
