= Koczała railway station =

Former railway station in Poland

Koczała

General information
- Location: Koczała; Poland
- Coordinates: 53.896983°N 17.068965°E
- Owner: Polskie Koleje Państwowe S.A.

Construction
- Structure type: Building: Yes (no longer used); Depot: Never existed Water tower: Yes

History
- Former names: Flötenstein
Location

Koczała is a former PKP railway station in Koczała (Pomeranian Voivodeship), Poland.
