= Szczytno, Pomeranian Voivodeship =

Szczytno
- Village
- Location within Poland
- Coordinates: 53°46′8″N 17°13′41″E
- Country: Poland
- Voivodeship: Pomeranian
- County: Człuchów
- Gmina: Przechlewo
- Population: 375

Szczytno [ˈʂt͡ʂɨtnɔ] (German: Ziethen) is a village in the administrative district of Gmina Przechlewo, within Człuchów County, Pomeranian Voivodeship, in northern Poland.

For details of the history of the region, see History of Pomerania.
