= Lisewo, Człuchów County =

Lisewo
- Village
- Location within Poland
- Coordinates: 53°45′59″N 17°15′50″E
- Country: Poland
- Voivodeship: Pomeranian
- County: Człuchów
- Gmina: Przechlewo
- Population: 136

Lisewo [liˈsɛvɔ] is a village in the administrative district of Gmina Przechlewo, within Człuchów County, Pomeranian Voivodeship, in northern Poland.

For details of the history of the region, see History of Pomerania.
