= Łękinia =

- Village
- Location within Poland
- Coordinates: 53°54′11″N 17°1′13″E
- Country: Poland
- Voivodeship: Pomeranian
- County: Człuchów
- Gmina: Koczała
- Population: 197

Łękinia [wɛnˈkiɲa] (German: Lanken) is a village in the administrative district of Gmina Koczała, within Człuchów County, Pomeranian Voivodeship, in northern Poland.

For details of the history of the region, see History of Pomerania.
