= Kiełpin railway station =

Railway station in Człuchów County, Poland

Coordinates: 53.7167°N 17.3953°E

Kiełpin

General information
- Location: Kiełpin; Poland
- Owner: Polskie Koleje Państwowe S.A.
- Platforms: None

Construction
- Structure type: Building: Yes (no longer used); Depot: Never existed Water tower: Never existed

History
- Former names: Woltersdorf (Kr. Schlochau)
Location

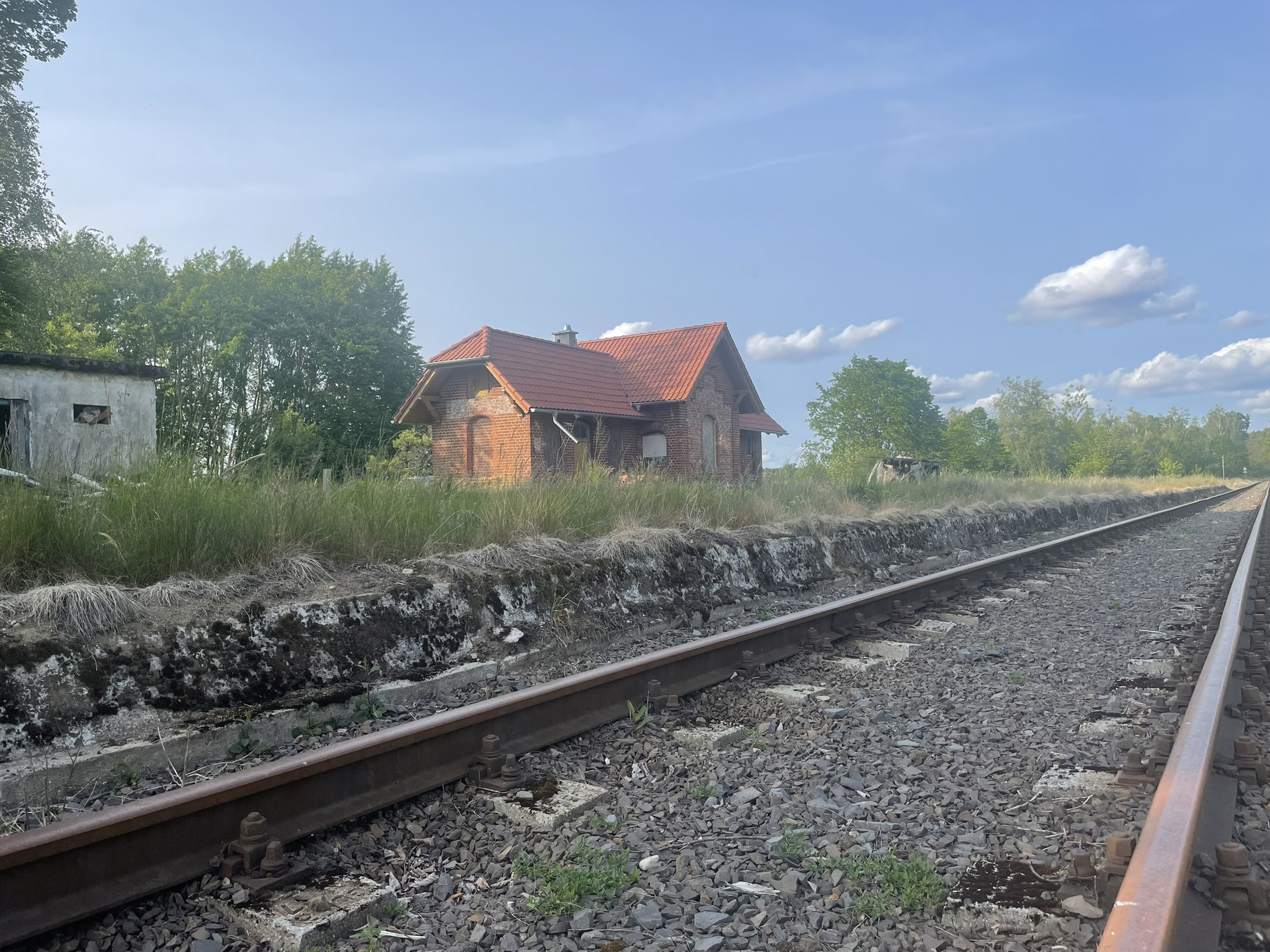
Stacka Kiełpin Railway Station

Kiełpin is a former PKP railway station in Kiełpin (Pomeranian Voivodeship), Poland.
