= Dolinka, Altai Krai =

Dolinka Долинка
- Selo
- Location within Altai Krai Location within Russia
- Coordinates: 53°01′N 80°06′E
- Country: Russia
- Region: Altai Krai
- District: Blagoveshchensky District
- Time zone: UTC+7:00

Dolinka (Russian: Долинка) is a rural locality (a selo) in Novokulundinsky Selsoviet, Blagoveshchensky District, Altai Krai, Russia. The population was 357 as of 2013. It was founded in 1912. There are 2 streets.

== Geography ==
Dolinka is located 39 km northeast of Blagoveshchenka (the district's administrative centre) by road. Novokulundinka is the nearest rural locality.
