= Biskupnica =

- Village
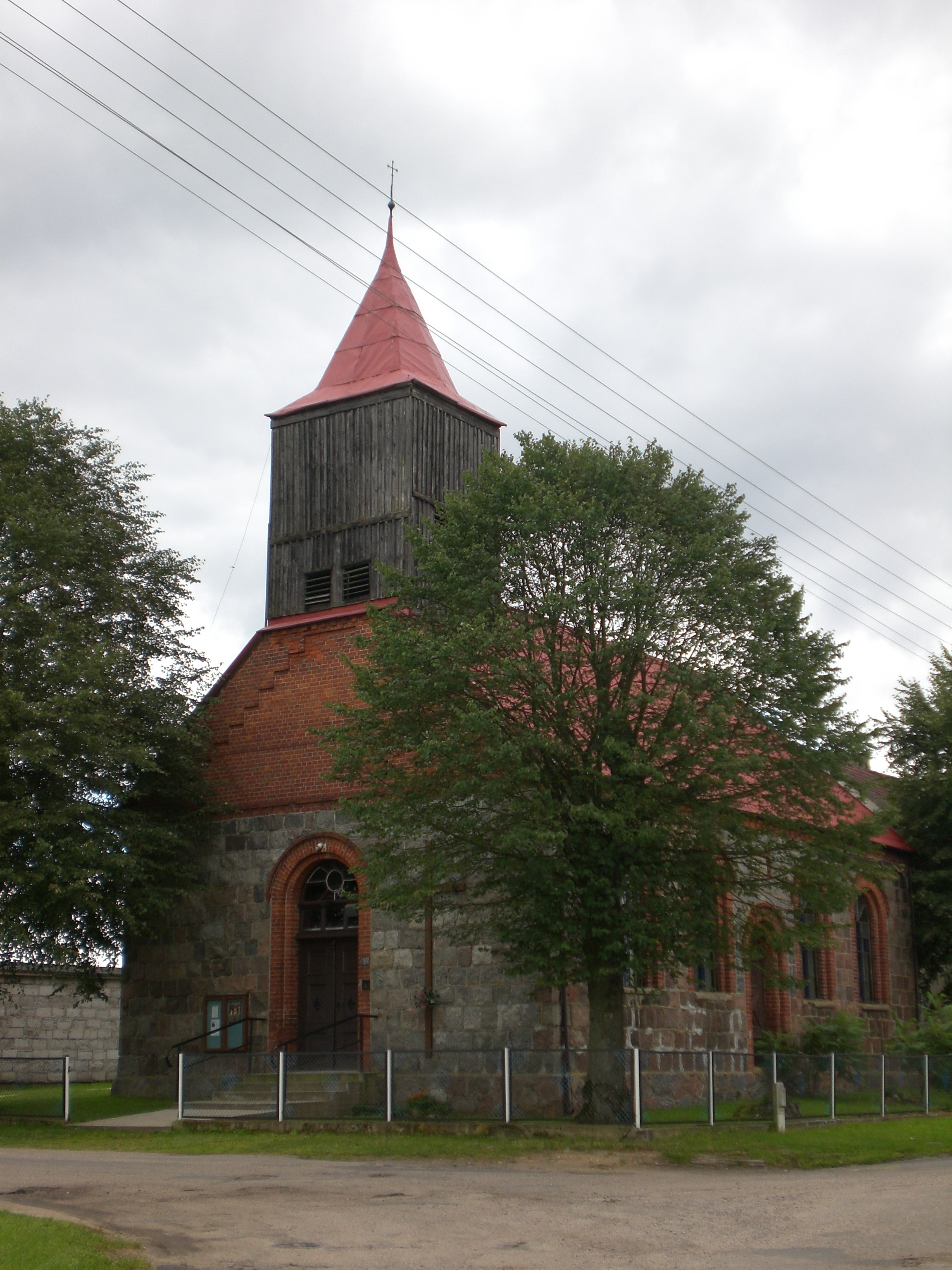
- Holy Cross church in Biskupnica

- Location within Poland
- Coordinates: 53°39′32″N 17°13′0″E
- Country: Poland
- Voivodeship: Pomeranian
- County: Człuchów
- Gmina: Człuchów
- Population: 345
- Time zone: UTC+1 (CET)
  - Summer (DST): UTC+2 (CEST)

Biskupnica [biskupˈnit͡sa] is a village in the administrative district of Gmina Człuchów, within Człuchów County, Pomeranian Voivodeship, in northern Poland. It is located within the historic region of Pomerania.

Polish State Railways serve the village's railway station.

Biskupnica was a royal village of the Polish Crown, administratively located in the Człuchów County in the Pomeranian Voivodeship.
