= Sąpolno Człuchowskie railway station =

Railway station in Sąpolno, Poland

Sąpolno Człuchowskie

General information
- Location: Sąpolno Człuchowskie; Poland
- Owner: Polskie Koleje Państwowe S.A.

Construction
- Structure type: Building: Yes (no longer used); Depot: Never existed Water tower: Never existed

History
- Former names: Sampohl
Location

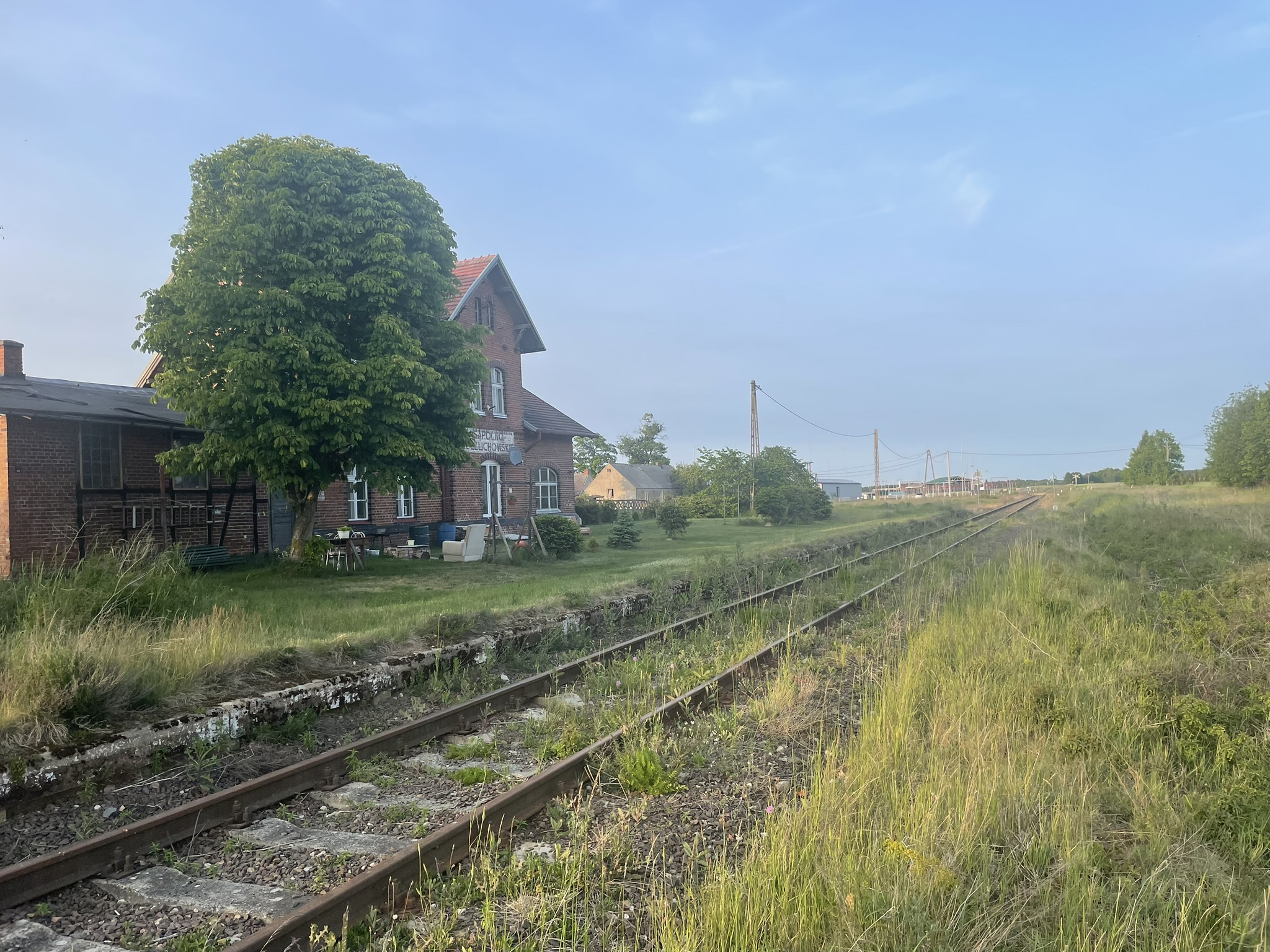
Railway stop in Sąpolno Człuchowski on railway line 413.

Sąpolno Człuchowskie is a former PKP railway station in Sąpolno Człuchowskie (Pomeranian Voivodeship), Poland.
