= Przechlewo =

- Village
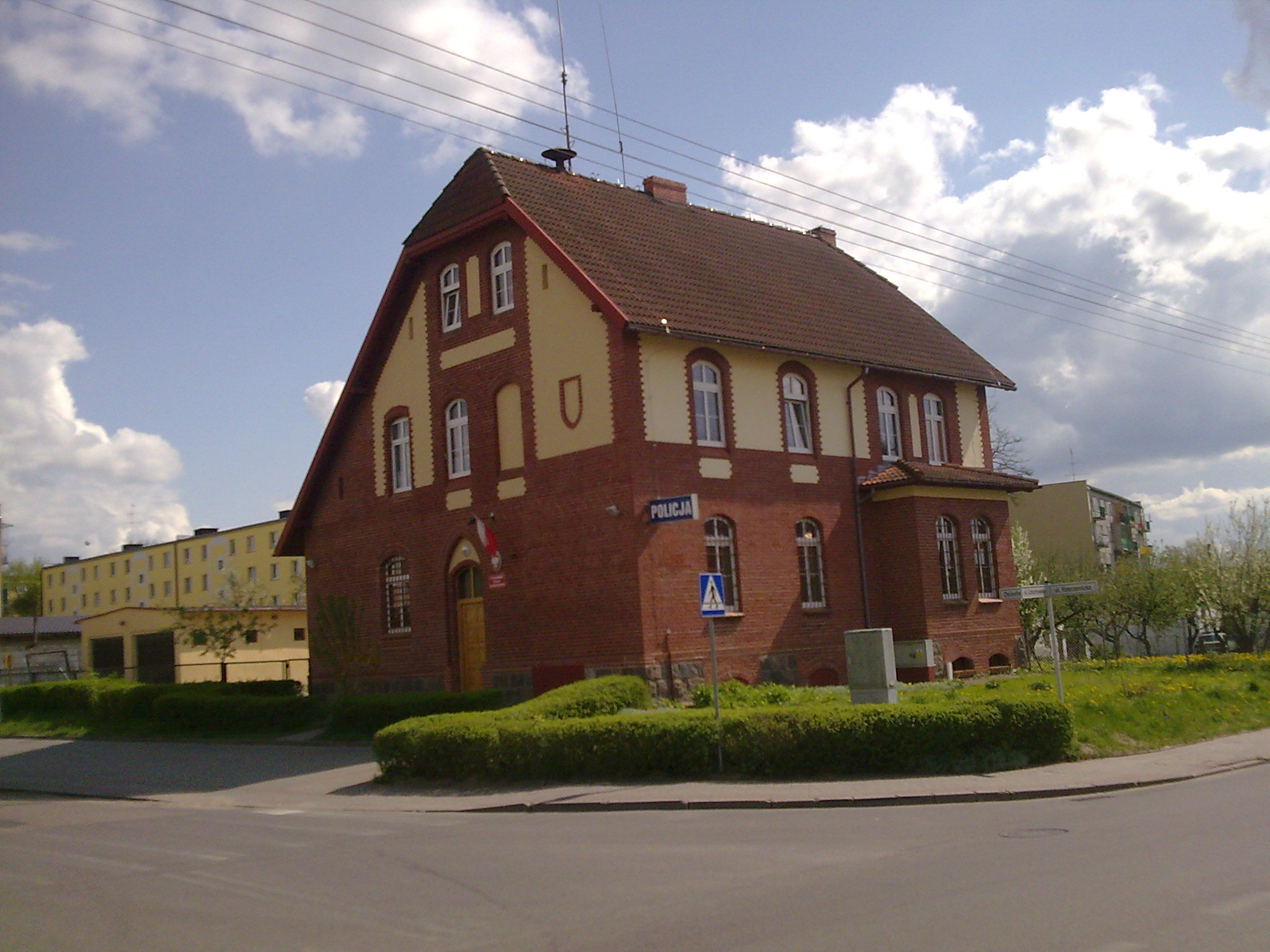
- Police station in Przechlewo

- Location within Poland
- Coordinates: 53°48′1″N 17°15′11″E
- Country: Poland
- Voivodeship: Pomeranian
- County: Człuchów
- Gmina: Przechlewo
- Elevation: 158 m (518 ft)
- Population: 2,826
- Time zone: UTC+1 (CET)
  - Summer (DST): UTC+2 (CEST)

Przechlewo [pʂɛˈxlɛvɔ] (German: Prechlau) is a village in Człuchów County, Pomeranian Voivodeship, in northwestern Poland. It is the seat of the gmina (administrative district) called Gmina Przechlewo. It is located within the historic region of Pomerania.

Przechlewo was a royal village of the Polish Crown, administratively located in the Człuchów County in the Pomeranian Voivodeship. During World War II the German Nazi administration operated a labor camp for prisoners of war from the Stalag II-B prisoner-of-war camp in the village.

There are two historic churches in Przechlewo: the Baroque-Gothic Revival Saint Anne church and the Gothic Revival Our Lady of Częstochowa church.

== Notable people ==
- Jan Lubiński (born 1953), Polish physician and professor
- Marta Żmuda Trzebiatowska (born 1984), Polish actress
