= Człuchów railway station =

Railway station in Człuchów, Poland

Człuchów
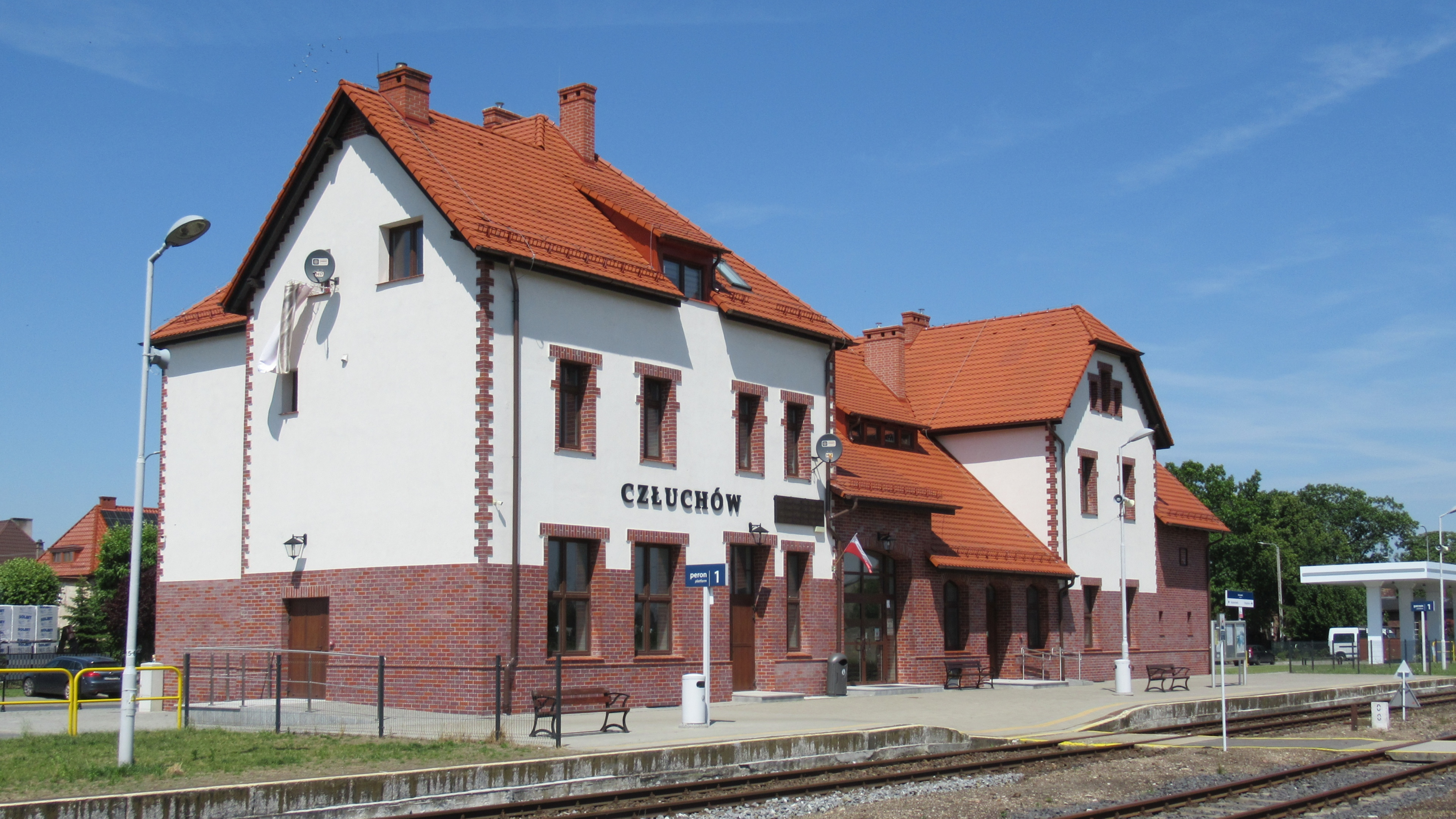
- Człuchów railway station

General information
- Location: Człuchów, Pomeranian Voivodeship; Poland
- System: Railway Station
- Operator: Polregio
- Lines: 210: Chojnice–Runowo Pomorskie railway 413: Człuchów–Słosinko railway
- Platforms: 3
Location
- Location within Poland Location within Europe

Człuchów railway station is a railway station serving the town of Człuchów, in the Pomeranian Voivodeship, Poland. The station is located on the Chojnice–Runowo Pomorskie railway and Człuchów–Słosinko railway. The train services are operated by Polregio.

The station was previously known as Schlochau (until 1945) and Słuchów (1945–1946).

== Train services ==
The station is served by the following service(s):

- Regional services (R) Słupsk — Miastko — Szczecinek — Chojnice
- Regional services (R) Szczecinek — Chojnice

Preceding station	Polregio	Following station
Biskupnica towards Szczecinek or Słupsk	PR	Brzeźno Człuchowskie towards Chojnice
