= Szczecinek railway station =

Railway station in Szczecinek, Poland

Coordinates: 53.6933°N 16.7053°E

Szczecinek
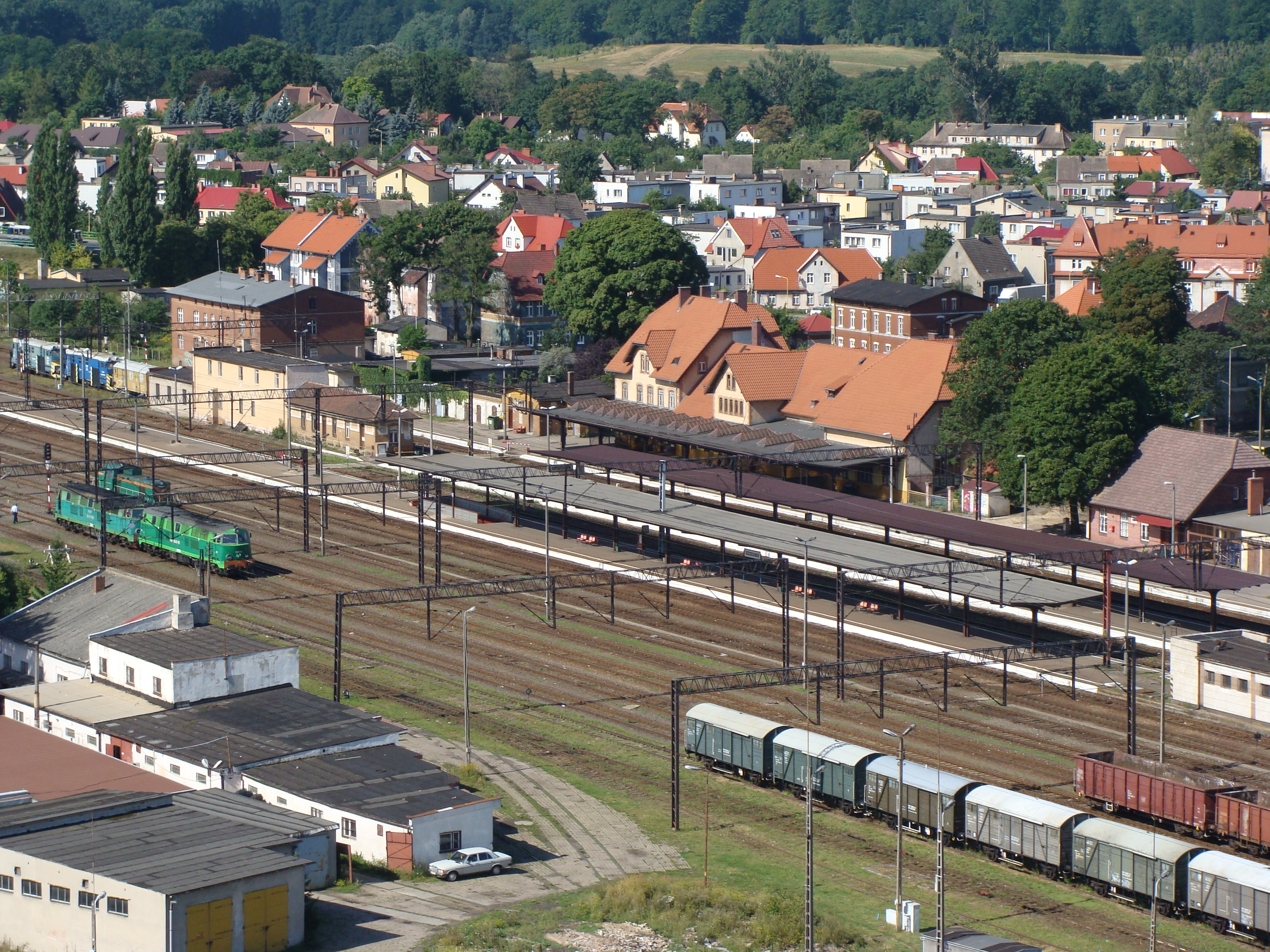
- Szczecinek railway station

General information
- Location: Szczecinek, West Pomeranian Voivodeship; Poland
- System: Railway Station
- Operator: PKP; Polregio
- Lines: 210: Chojnice–Runowo Pomorskie railway 404: Szczecinek–Kołobrzeg railway 405: Piła–Ustka railway
- Platforms: 5
Location
- Location within Poland

Szczecinek railway station is a railway station serving the town of Szczecinek, in the West Pomeranian Voivodeship, Poland. The station is located on the Piła–Ustka railway, Szczecinek–Kołobrzeg railway and Chojnice–Runowo Pomorskie railway. The train services are operated by PKP and Polregio.

== Train services ==
The station is served by the following service(s):

- Intercity services (IC) Kołobrzeg - Piła - Bydgoszcz - Warszawa - Lublin - Hrubieszów
- Intercity services (IC) Ustka - Koszalin - Poznań - Wrocław - Opole - Bielsko-Biała
- Intercity services (IC) Ustka - Koszalin - Poznań - Wrocław - Katowice - Kraków - Rzeszów - Przemyśl
- Intercity services (IC) Słupsk - Koszalin - Poznań - Wrocław
- Intercity services (IC) Słupsk - Koszalin - Poznań - Wrocław - Opole - Katowice
- Regional services (R) Kolobrzeg - Bialogard - Szczecinek - Pila - Oborniki - Poznan
- Regional services (R) Koszalin - Bialogard - Szczecinek - Pila - Oborniki - Poznan
- Regional services (R) Słupsk — Miastko
- Regional services (R) Słupsk — Miastko — Szczecinek
- Regional services (R) Słupsk — Miastko — Szczecinek — Chojnice
- Regional services (R) Szczecinek — Chojnice
- Regional services (R) Miastko — Szczecinek — Runowo Pomorskie
- Regional services (R) Szczecinek - Drawsko Pomorskie - Stargard - Szczecin

Preceding station	PKP Intercity	Following station
Białogard towards Kołobrzeg	IC	Jastrowie towards Hrubieszów Miasto
Białogard towards Ustka	IC	Jastrowie towards Bielsko-Biała Główna
Białogard towards Ustka	IC	Piła Główna towards Przemyśl Główny
Białogard towards Słupsk	IC	Jastrowie towards Wrocław Główny or Katowice
Preceding station	Polregio	Following station
Szczecinek Chyże towards Kołobrzeg	PR	Turowo Pomorskie towards Poznań Główny
Szczecinek Chyże towards Koszalin	PR	Turowo Pomorskie towards Poznań Główny
Czarnobór towards Chojnice	PR	Gwda Mała towards Słupsk
Terminus	PR	Gwda Mała towards Słupsk
Czarnobór towards Chojnice	PR	Terminus
Jelenino towards Runowo Pomorskie	PR	Czarnobór towards Miastko
Jelenino towards Szczecin Główny	PR	Terminus
