= Brzezie =

Brzezie may refer to the following places in Poland:

- Brzezie, Gostyń County in Greater Poland Voivodeship (west-central Poland)
- Brzezie, Kępno County in Greater Poland Voivodeship (west-central Poland)
- Brzezie, Koło County in Greater Poland Voivodeship (central Poland)
- Brzezie, Pleszew County in Greater Poland Voivodeship (west-central Poland)
- Brzezie, Gmina Środa Wielkopolska, Środa County in Greater Poland Voivodeship (west-central Poland)
- Brzezie, Kuyavian-Pomeranian Voivodeship (central Poland)
- Brzezie, Kraków County in Lesser Poland Voivodeship (south Poland)
- Brzezie, Wieliczka County in Lesser Poland Voivodeship (south Poland)
- Brzezie, Gmina Drużbice in Łódź Voivodeship (central Poland)
- Brzezie, Gmina Szczerców in Łódź Voivodeship (central Poland)
- Brzezie, Piotrków County in Łódź Voivodeship (central Poland)
- Brzezie, Lower Silesian Voivodeship (south-west Poland)
- Brzezie (Pomorsko) in Lubusz Voivodeship (west Poland)
- Brzezie (Sulechów) in Lubusz Voivodeship (west Poland)
- Brzezie, Busko County in Świętokrzyskie Voivodeship (south Poland)
- Brzezie, Opatów County in Świętokrzyskie Voivodeship (south-central Poland)
- Brzezie, Starachowice County in Świętokrzyskie Voivodeship (south-central Poland)
- Brzezie, Opole Voivodeship (south Poland)
- Brzezie, Pomeranian Voivodeship (north Poland)
- Brzezie, Racibórz in Silesian Voivodeship (south Poland)
