= Bagnica =

Bagnica refers to the following places in Poland:

- Bagnica, Pomeranian Voivodeship
- Bagnica, West Pomeranian Voivodeship
