= Knieja =

Knieja may refer to the following places:

- Knieja, Tuchola County in Kuyavian-Pomeranian Voivodeship (north-central Poland)
- Knieja, Żnin County in Kuyavian-Pomeranian Voivodeship (north-central Poland)
- Knieja, Silesian Voivodeship (south Poland)
- Knieja, Opole Voivodeship (south-west Poland)
- Knieja, Człuchów County in Pomeranian Voivodeship (north Poland)
- Knieja, Kościerzyna County in Pomeranian Voivodeship (north Poland)
- Knieja, West Pomeranian Voivodeship (north-west Poland)
