= Honorary Citizen of Gmina Sulechów =

List of people awarded honorary citizenship by the Sulechów Town Council

Honorary Citizens of Gmina Sulechów are individuals granted honorary citizenship by the City Council of Sulechów, a town in Gmina Sulechów, Poland. The title, established by the town authorities in April 2001, recognizes contributions to the gmina in various fields. The Sulechów City Council is the sole body authorized to confer this distinction.

== History ==
=== Before 2001 ===
The Sulechów town authorities have periodically recognized individuals for their contributions to the community. The first such recognition took place on 13 February 1960, marking the 15th anniversary of the city's return to Poland, when 59 individuals received honorary diplomas. In 1985, under the initiative of the Patriotic Movement for National Rebirth, 29 individuals who had served the town for at least 25 years were awarded the title of "Sulechów Citizens of the 40th Anniversary of the Polish People's Republic". A third recognition occurred on 1 June 1995, commemorating 50 years of Polish civil administration in Sulechów, when 15 residents who contributed to the town's early post-war development received commemorative plaques. Between 1995 and 1997, 36 individuals were honored with plaques for their contributions to the town's development after 1950, with 24 recognized in 1995, nine in 1996, and three in 1997.

=== Since 2001 ===
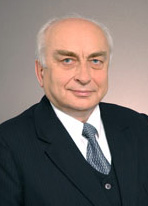
Marian Miłek was awarded the title of Honorary Citizen of Gmina Sulechów by Resolution No. XXXVII/345/2002 of the Sulechów City Council on 12 September 2002

On 3 April 2001, the Sulechów City Council passed a resolution establishing the title of "Honorary Citizen of Gmina Sulechów". The first recipients received the honor during the 37th regular session of the city council (2002–2006 term) on 12 September 2002. Six individuals were recognized: four Poles – Stanisław Butlak, Bernard Grupa, Marian Miłek, and Ksawery Pierożek – and two foreigners, Ruth Schulz from Germany and Angelina Slepikas from the Netherlands. This was the only occasion when more than two individuals were honored on a single day. During the 2002–2006 term, three additional individuals were recognized: Bobb Cobb from England in December 2003, and Damian Przybylski and Leon Okowiński in January 2005. During the 2006–2010 term, two individuals received the title: Olgierd Banaś in June 2007 and Franciszek Uściński in October 2010. In the term beginning in 2010, two individuals were honored: Ignacy Odważny and Sławomir Owczarek.

== Regulations ==
=== Nominations ===
==== Submission process ====
According to the regulations for conferring honorary citizenship of Gmina Sulechów, a nomination must be supported by the signatures of at least 50 residents. The candidate is required to provide written consent for the nomination, and the application must include a justification outlining their contributions to the town and commune.

==== Review process ====
Nominations are submitted to the Chairperson of the Sulechów City Council, who forwards them to the Health, Education, and Culture Committee. The committee reviews the application and presents its opinion to the chairperson. At the following council session, the chairperson submits the committee's opinion and the nomination for consideration. If approved, the city council adopts a resolution granting honorary citizenship.

=== Privileges ===
Recipients of honorary citizenship receive a signed "Honorary Citizen of Gmina Sulechów Diploma" and a commemorative plaque from the Chairperson of the City Council. They are also invited to significant communal events.

== List of honorary citizens ==
No.	Name	Date of award	Brief biography (reason for award)
1.	Ruth Schulz	12 September 2002	A pre-1945 resident of Sulechów who contributed to the town post-war, particularly supporting the local hospital.
2.	Angelina Slepikas	12 September 2002	Founder of the Diepenveen–Sulechów (now Deventer–Sulechów) Aid and Cooperation Committee.
3.	Marian Miłek	12 September 2002	Founder and rector (1998–2007) of the Higher Vocational School of Public Administration in Sulechów, later transformed into the Vocational Higher Education School in Sulechów.
4.	Ksawery Pierożek	12 September 2002	Conductor of the town's brass band at the Sulechów Culture and Sports Center from 1960 to 2003.
5.	Bernard Grupa	12 September 2002	Founder of the Cantabile Choir at the Sulechów Cultural Center, leading it since 1982; recipient of multiple national and local awards for cultural contributions.
6.	Stanisław Butlak	12 September 2002	Commander of the 5th Lubusz Artillery Regiment from 1995 to 2003.
7.	Bobb Cobb	30 December 2003	Long-time organizer of material aid for Sulechów's healthcare system and initiator of the partnership with Rushmoor.
8.	Leon Okowiński	25 January 2005	Regional historian and author of numerous works on Sulechów and its surroundings.
9.	Damian Przybylski	25 January 2005	Long-time coach of Zawisza Sulechów's first and youth teams, achieving successes at regional and national levels.
10.	Olgierd Banaś	19 June 2007	Parish priest of St. Stanislaus Bishop in Łęgowo, initiator of the restoration of the historic Visitation of the Blessed Virgin Mary Church in Klępsk.
11.	Franciszek Uściński	19 October 2010	Organizer of cultural life in Sulechów during the 1950s and 1960s, composer of the town's anthem and two songs about the town, and cabaret artist.
12.	Ignacy Odważny	19 April 2011	Mayor of Sulechów for two terms (2002–2010), contributing to the reconstruction of public facilities and infrastructure development across the gmina.
13.	Sławomir Owczarek	17 September 2013	Long-time commander of the 5th Lubusz Artillery Regiment until 2013.
