= Roman Krzyżelewski =

Former Polish Navy commander-in-chief

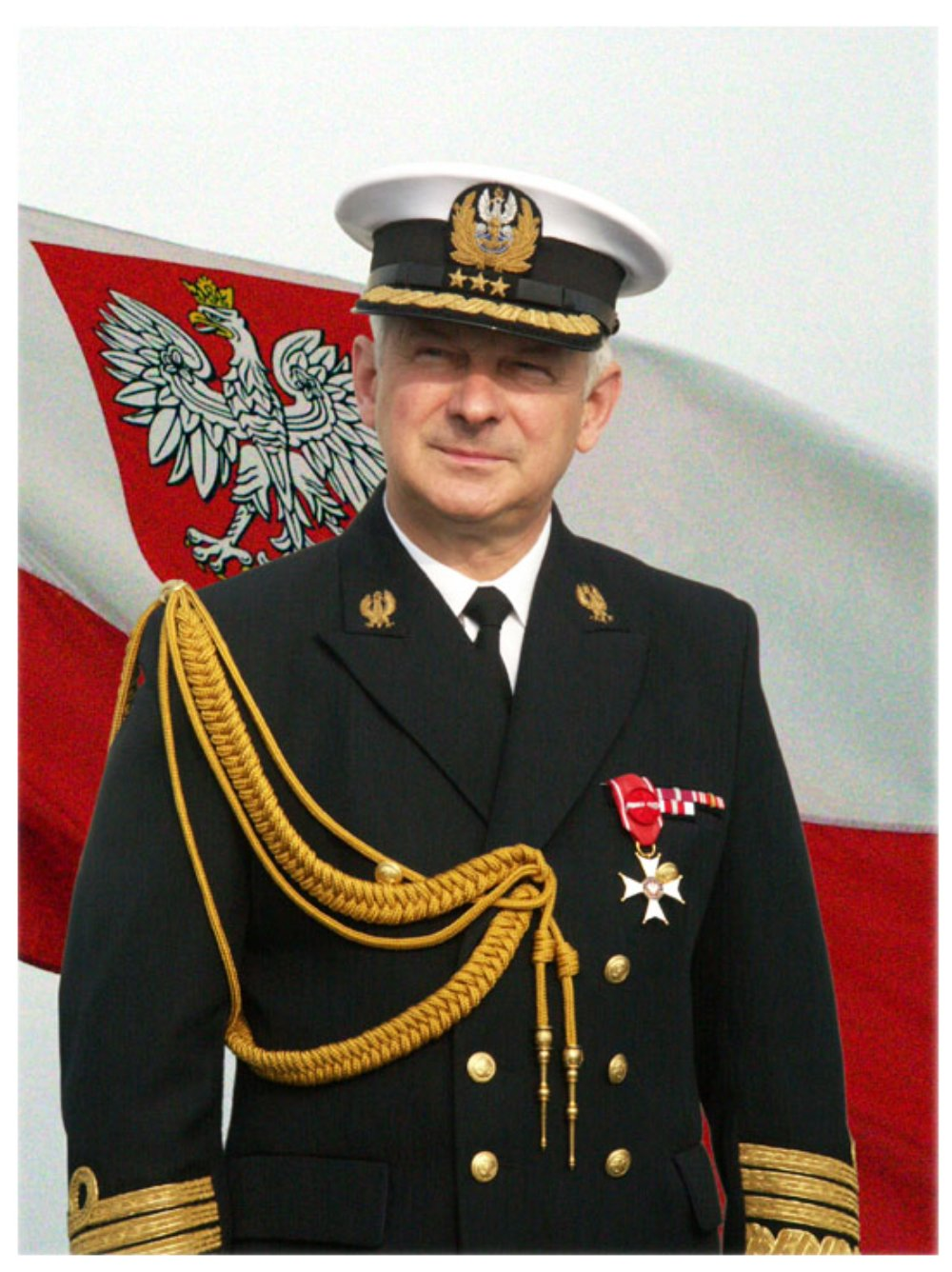
- Born: January 25, 1949 (age 77); Rzeczenica, Poland
- Service years: 1968–2007
- Rank: Admirał floty (Vice admiral)
- Awards

Roman Krzyżelewski (born January 25, 1949, in Rzeczenica, Poland) was the commander-in-chief of the Polish Navy between October 2003 and November 2007. For most of his career he was a Submarine Officer, although he started his career as a Weapons Conscript on board an Osa-class missile boat

== Biography ==
Roman Piotr Krzyżelewski was born on January 25, 1949 in Rzeczenica. In 1967, he graduated from Stefan Czarniecki High School in Człuchów and was accepted to the Polish Naval Academy in Gdynia. After four years of studies, in 1971 he obtained the professional title of navigation engineer and was promoted to the first officer rank. From 1977 to 1979, he completed postgraduate operational and tactical studies at the Command Department of the Naval Academy. He also completed postgraduate Operational and Strategic Studies at the Academy of the General Staff of the Polish Armed Forces.

He began his naval career by serving on the ORP Warszawa guided missile destroyer, which was part of the 3rd Ship Flotilla in Gdynia. Initially, he took over as commander of the artillery fire control center, and from 1973 to 1975 he was the commander of the artillery group in the ship's II missile and artillery section. Then, until 1977, he was commander of the ship's III underwater weapons section. After completing postgraduate studies in 1979, he returned to "Warszawa", where he was appointed commander of the aviation command and guidance station. From 1980, he was deputy commander of the 1st Missile-Torpedo Boat Squadron of the 3rd Ship Flotilla. In 1982, he took over command of this division. In the period from 1985 to 1987 he completed staff practice at the Navy Command as a senior specialist officer in the Operations Department. In 1988 he became a deputy commander and in 1989 a commander of the 3rd Ship Flotilla. He later served as head of Navy Training. In 1999, with the rank of rear admiral, he was transferred to the Polish General Staff as head of the General Logistics Directorate.

On 25 September 2003, he received a promotion to the military rank of vice admiral from President Aleksander Kwaśniewski. On 1 October 2003, he replaced vice admiral Ryszard Łukasik as commander of the Navy. On 10 July 2007, vice admiral Roman Krzyżelewski submitted a request to be released from professional military service. He justified his decision by the lack of influence on the staffing of positions in the Navy Command. He was dismissed on November 11, 2007.

== Promotions ==
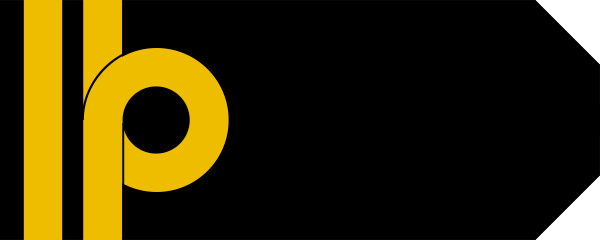
- Podporucznik marynarki (Ensign) – 1971
- Porucznik marynarki (Lieutenant junior grade) – 1974
- Kapitan marynarki (Lieutenant) – 1977
- Komandor podporucznik (Lieutenant commander) – 1981
- Komandor porucznik (Commander) – 1984
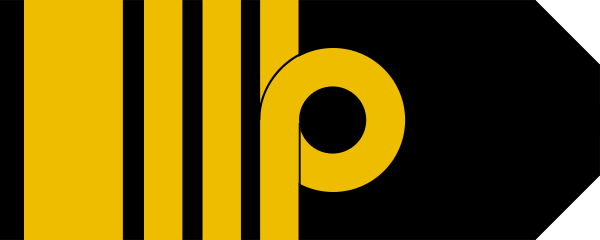
- Komandor (Captain) – 1988
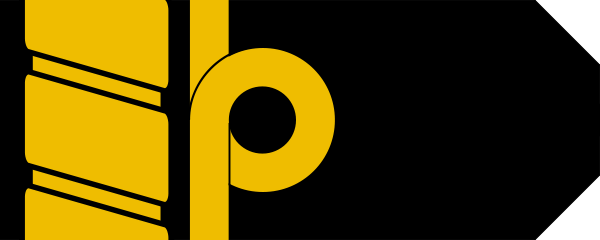
- Kontradmirał (Commodore) – 1992
- Wiceadmirał (Rear admiral) – 1999
- Admirał floty (Vice admiral) – 2003

== Honours and awards ==
- Commander's Cross of the Order of Polonia Restituta
- Officer's Cross of the Order of Polonia Restituta
- Knight's Cross of the Order of Polonia Restituta
- Silver Cross of Merit
- Gold Medal of the Armed Forces in the Service of the Fatherland
- Silver Medal of the Armed Forces in the Service of the Fatherland
- Silver Medal of Merit for National Defence
- Medal Milito Pro Christo
- Commander of the Legion of Merit (USA)

== Bibliography ==
- (in Polish) Lt. Cmdr. Reserve MSc Walter Pater, Commanders of the 3rd Ship Flotilla, published in Przegląd Morski No. 3/2006 – Editorial Office of Navy Magazines, Gdynia 2006, ISSN 0137-7205
- "New Commander of the Navy". Sees, Ships and Vessels. November 2003. p. 8.
