= Buków, Lubusz Voivodeship =

Buków
- Village
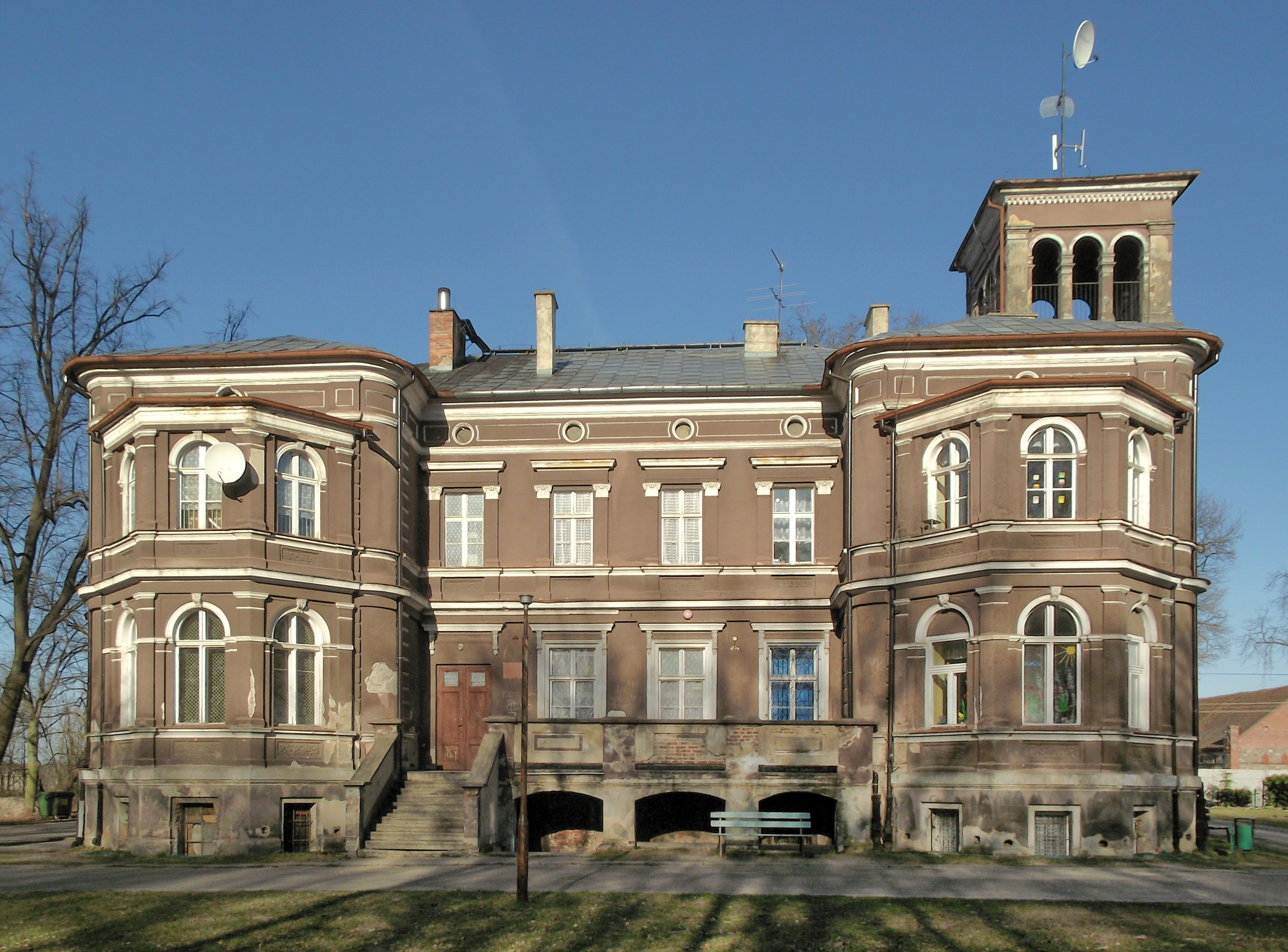
- Palace in Buków

- Location within Poland
- Coordinates: 52°9′N 15°39′E
- Country: Poland
- Voivodeship: Lubusz
- County: Zielona Góra
- Gmina: Sulechów

Buków [ˈbukuf] is a village in the administrative district of Gmina Sulechów, within Zielona Góra County, Lubusz Voivodeship, in western Poland.
