= Olszanowo =

- Village
- Location within Poland
- Coordinates: 53°41′23″N 17°7′59″E
- Country: Poland
- Voivodeship: Pomeranian
- County: Człuchów
- Gmina: Rzeczenica
- Population: 129

Olszanowo [ɔlʂaˈnɔvɔ] (German: Elsenau) is a village in the administrative district of Gmina Rzeczenica, within Człuchów County, Pomeranian Voivodeship, in northern Poland.

For details of the history of the region, see History of Pomerania.
