= Zbysławiec =

- Village
- Location within Poland
- Coordinates: 53°43′30″N 17°10′57″E
- Country: Poland
- Voivodeship: Pomeranian
- County: Człuchów
- Gmina: Rzeczenica

Zbysławiec [zbɨˈswavjɛt͡s] is a village in the administrative district of Gmina Rzeczenica, within Człuchów County, Pomeranian Voivodeship, in northern Poland.

For details of the history of the region, see History of Pomerania.
