= Gmina Rzeczenica =

Gmina Rzeczenica Rzeczenica Commune
- Gmina
- Interactive map of Gmina Rzeczenica
- Coordinates (Rzeczenica): 53°45′25″N 17°6′24″E
- Country: Poland
- Voivodeship: Pomeranian
- County: Człuchów
- Seat: Rzeczenica

Area
  - Total: 274.92 km^{2} (106.15 sq mi)

Population (2006)
  - Total: 3,721
  - Density: 13.53/km^{2} (35.06/sq mi)
- Website: http://www.rzeczenica.pl/

Gmina Rzeczenica is a rural gmina (administrative district) in Człuchów County, Pomeranian Voivodeship, in northern Poland. Its seat is the village of Rzeczenica, which lies approximately 21 kilometres (13 mi) north-west of Człuchów and 121 km (75 mi) south-west of the regional capital Gdańsk.

The gmina covers an area of 274.92 square kilometres (106.1 sq mi), and as of 2006 its total population is 3,721.

== Villages ==
Gmina Rzeczenica contains the villages and settlements of Bagnica, Breńsk, Brzezie, Cierniki, Dzików, Garsk, Gockowo, Grodzisko, Gwieździn, Iwie, Jelnia, Jeziernik, Knieja, Lestnica, Łuszczyn, Międzybórz, Olszanowo, Pieniężnica, Przeręba, Przyrzecze, Rzeczenica, Sporysz, Trzmielewo, Zadębie, Zalesie and Zbysławiec.

== Neighbouring gminas ==
Gmina Rzeczenica is bordered by the gminas of Biały Bór, Czarne, Człuchów, Koczała, Przechlewo and Szczecinek.
