= Górzykowo =

- Village
- Location within Poland
- Coordinates: 52°02′18″N 15°38′20″E
- Country: Poland
- Voivodeship: Lubusz
- County: Zielona Góra
- Gmina: Sulechów

Górzykowo [ɡuʐɨˈkɔvɔ] is a village in the administrative district of Gmina Sulechów, within Zielona Góra County, Lubusz Voivodeship, in western Poland.
