= Przyrzecze, Pomeranian Voivodeship =

Przyrzecze
- Settlement
- Location within Poland
- Coordinates: 53°44′46″N 17°1′43″E
- Country: Poland
- Voivodeship: Pomeranian
- County: Człuchów
- Gmina: Rzeczenica
- Population: 18

Przyrzecze [pʂɨˈʐɛt͡ʂɛ] is a settlement in the administrative district of Gmina Rzeczenica, within Człuchów County, Pomeranian Voivodeship, in northern Poland.

For details of the history of the region, see History of Pomerania.
