= Zalesie, Człuchów County =

Zalesie
- Village
- Location within Poland
- Coordinates: 53°43′5″N 17°5′53″E
- Country: Poland
- Voivodeship: Pomeranian
- County: Człuchów
- Gmina: Rzeczenica

Population
  - Total: 113
- Time zone: UTC+1 (CET)
  - Summer (DST): UTC+2 (CEST)
- Vehicle registration: GCZ

Zalesie [zaˈlɛɕɛ] is a village in the administrative district of Gmina Rzeczenica, within Człuchów County, Pomeranian Voivodeship, in northern Poland.
