= Pomorsko =

- Village
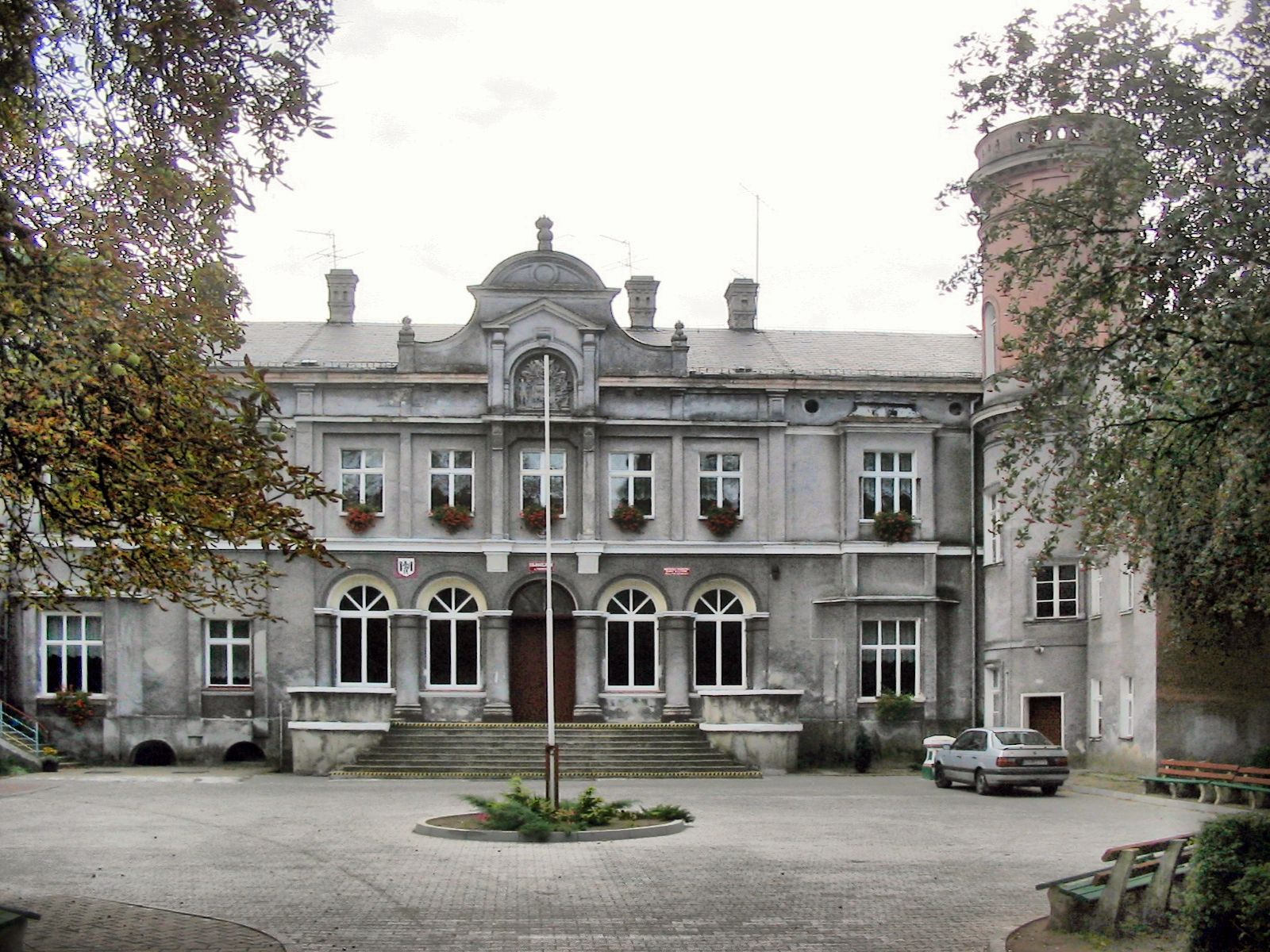
- Former manor house

- Location within Poland
- Coordinates: 52°3′N 15°28′E
- Country: Poland
- Voivodeship: Lubusz
- County: Zielona Góra
- Gmina: Sulechów

Population
  - Total: 580

Pomorsko [pɔˈmɔrskɔ] is a village in the administrative district of Gmina Sulechów, within Zielona Góra County, Lubusz Voivodeship, in western Poland.
