= Przeręba =

- Settlement
- Location within Poland
- Coordinates: 53°45′3″N 16°57′58″E
- Country: Poland
- Voivodeship: Pomeranian
- County: Człuchów
- Gmina: Rzeczenica
- Population: 25

Przeręba [pʂɛˈrɛmba] is a settlement in the administrative district of Gmina Rzeczenica, within Człuchów County, Pomeranian Voivodeship, in northern Poland.

For details of the history of the region, see History of Pomerania.
