= Cierniki =

- Settlement
- Location within Poland
- Coordinates: 53°47′49″N 17°1′4″E
- Country: Poland
- Voivodeship: Pomeranian
- County: Człuchów
- Gmina: Rzeczenica

Cierniki [t͡ɕɛrˈniki] is a settlement in the administrative district of Gmina Rzeczenica, within Człuchów County, Pomeranian Voivodeship, in northern Poland.

For details of the history of the region, see History of Pomerania.
