= Trzmielewo, Pomeranian Voivodeship =

Trzmielewo
- Village
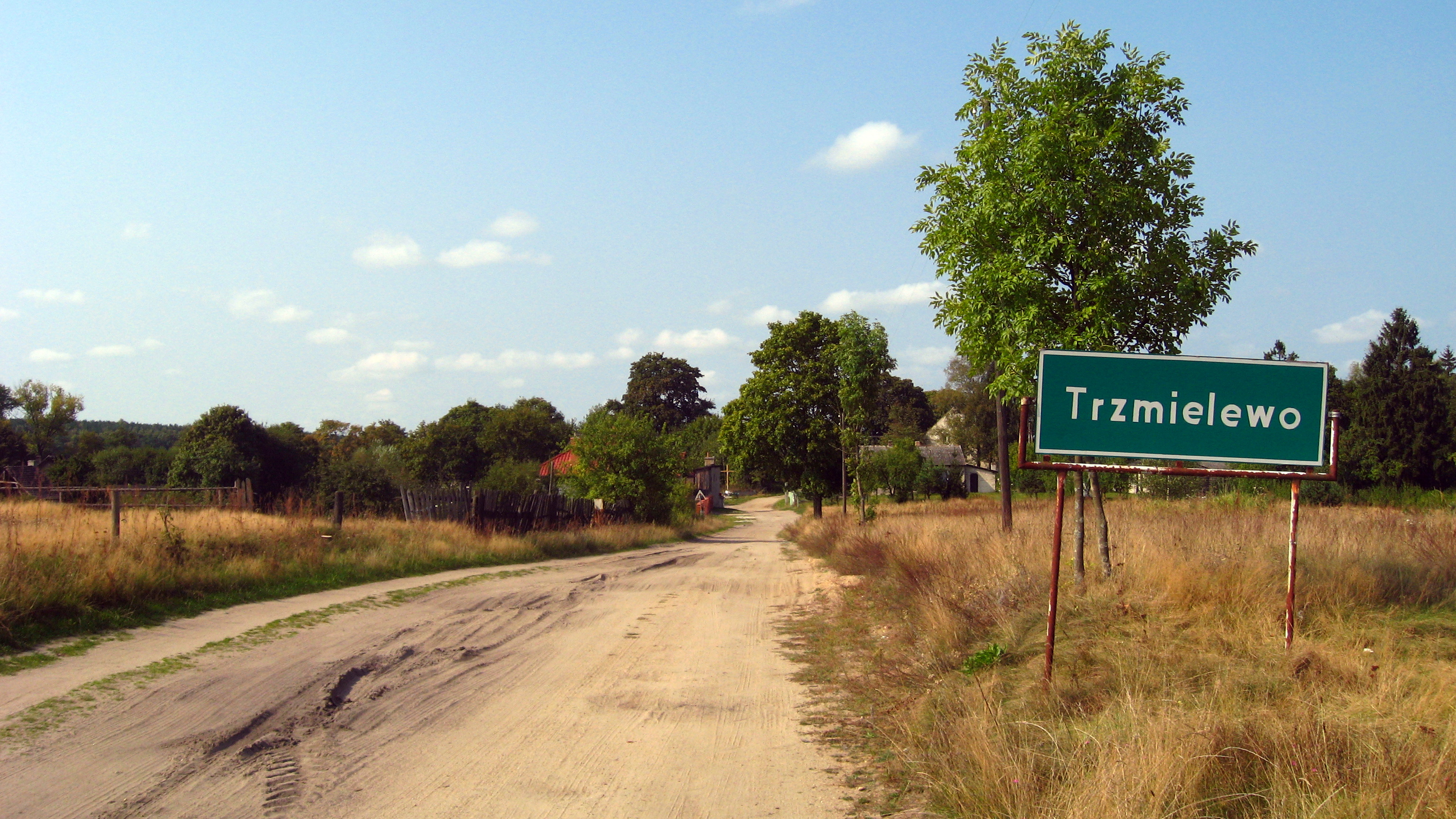

- Location within Poland
- Coordinates: 53°51′6″N 16°52′4″E
- Country: Poland
- Voivodeship: Pomeranian
- County: Człuchów
- Gmina: Rzeczenica
- Population: 22
- Time zone: UTC+1 (CET)
  - Summer (DST): UTC+2 (CEST)

Trzmielewo [tʂmjɛˈlɛvɔ] is a village in the administrative district of Gmina Rzeczenica, within Człuchów County, Pomeranian Voivodeship, in northern Poland. It is located within the historic region of Pomerania.

Trzmielewo was a royal village of the Polish Crown, administratively located in the Pomeranian Voivodeship.
