= Łuszczyn, Pomeranian Voivodeship =

Łuszczyn
- Settlement
- Location within Poland
- Coordinates: 53°46′12″N 17°1′48″E
- Country: Poland
- Voivodeship: Pomeranian
- County: Człuchów
- Gmina: Rzeczenica

Population
  - Total: 32

Łuszczyn [ˈwuʂt͡ʂɨn] is a settlement in the administrative district of Gmina Rzeczenica, within Człuchów County, Pomeranian Voivodeship, in northern Poland.

== See also ==
- History of Pomerania
