= Górki Małe, Lubusz Voivodeship =

Górki Małe
- Village
- Location within Poland
- Coordinates: 52°02′17″N 15°36′03″E
- Country: Poland
- Voivodeship: Lubusz
- County: Zielona Góra
- Gmina: Sulechów

Górki Małe [ˈɡurki ˈmawɛ] is a village in the administrative district of Gmina Sulechów, within Zielona Góra County, Lubusz Voivodeship, in western Poland.
