= Nowy Klępsk =

- Village
- Location within Poland
- Coordinates: 52°8′9″N 15°42′18″E
- Country: Poland
- Voivodeship: Lubusz
- County: Zielona Góra
- Gmina: Sulechów
- Population: 10

Nowy Klępsk [ˈnɔvɨ ˈklɛmpsk] is a village in the administrative district of Gmina Sulechów, within Zielona Góra County, Lubusz Voivodeship, in western Poland.
