= Cigacice =

- Village
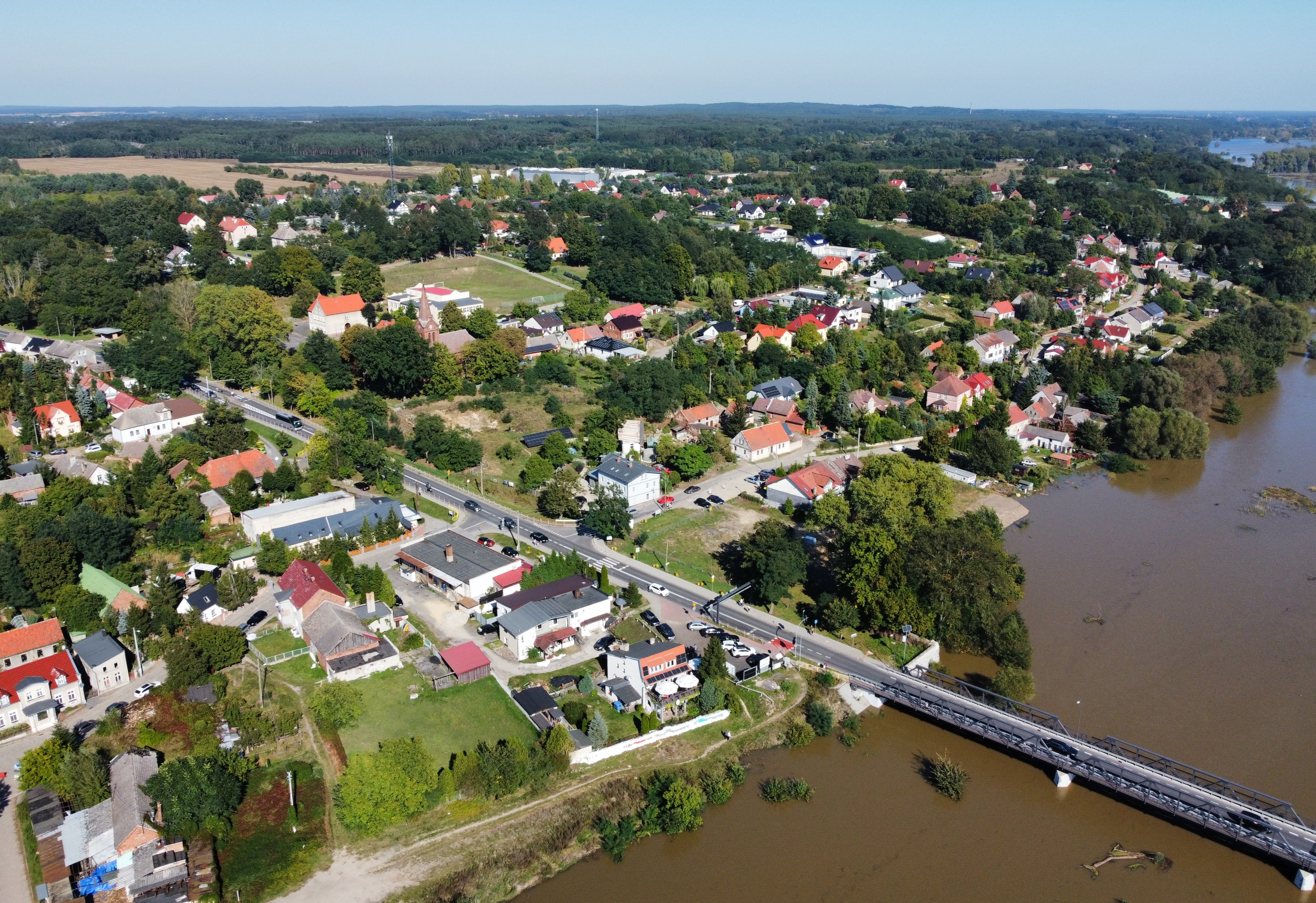

- Location within Poland
- Coordinates: 52°2′N 15°37′E
- Country: Poland
- Voivodeship: Lubusz
- County: Zielona Góra
- Gmina: Sulechów
- Population: 750
- Website: cigacice.free.pl

Cigacice [t͡ɕiɡaˈt͡ɕit͡sɛ] is a village in the administrative district of Gmina Sulechów, within Zielona Góra County, Lubusz Voivodeship, in western Poland.
