= Karczyn, Lubusz Voivodeship =

Karczyn
- Village
- Location within Poland
- Coordinates: 52°09′07″N 15°42′06″E
- Country: Poland
- Voivodeship: Lubusz
- County: Zielona Góra
- Gmina: Sulechów

Karczyn [ˈkart͡ʂɨn] is a village in the administrative district of Gmina Sulechów, within Zielona Góra County, Lubusz Voivodeship, in western Poland.
