= Nowy Świat, Zielona Góra County =

Nowy Świat
- Village
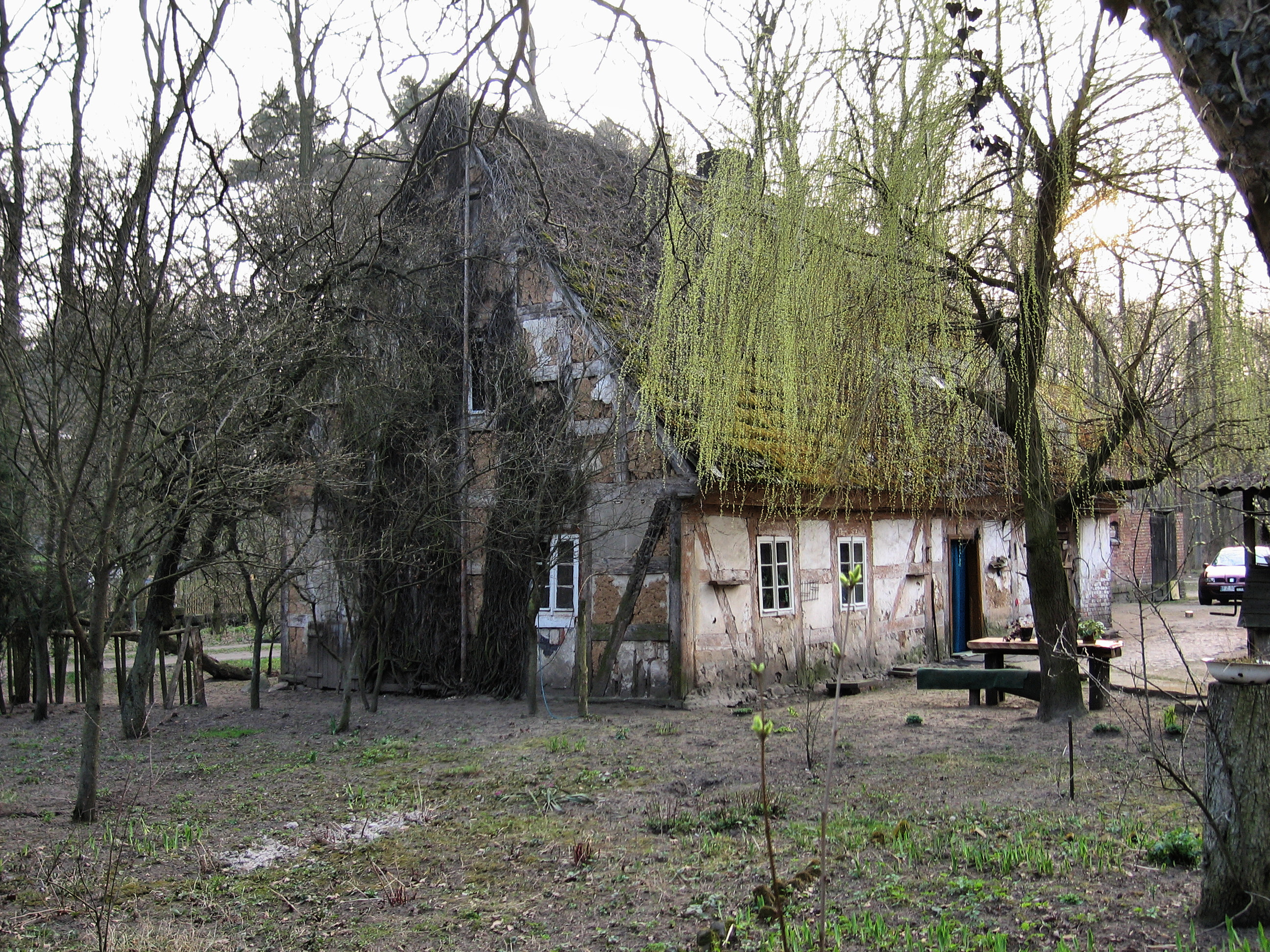
- timber-framed house in Nowy Świat

- Location within Poland
- Coordinates: 52°02′59″N 15°37′03″E
- Country: Poland
- Voivodeship: Lubusz
- County: Zielona Góra
- Gmina: Sulechów

Nowy Świat (Polish: [ˈnɔvɨ ˈɕfjat]; "New World") is a village in the administrative district of Gmina Sulechów, within Zielona Góra County, Lubusz Voivodeship, in western Poland.
