= Gmina Sulechów =

Gmina Sulechów Sulechów Commune
- Gmina
- Flag Coat of arms

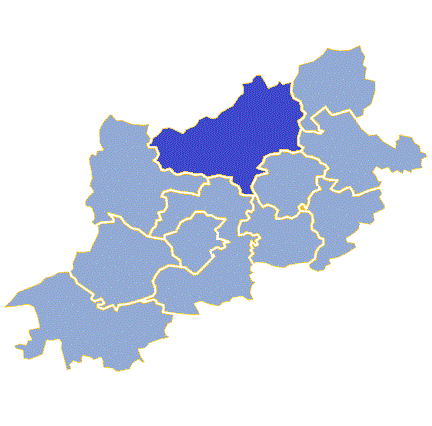
- Gmina Sulechów in Zielona Góra County
- Coordinates (Sulechów): 52°5′N 15°37′E
- Country: Poland
- Voivodeship: Lubusz
- County: Zielona Góra
- Seat: Sulechów

Area
  - Total: 236.57 km^{2} (91.34 sq mi)

Population (2024-06-30)
  - Total: 23,935
  - Density: 101.18/km^{2} (262.04/sq mi)
  - Urban: 14,035
  - Rural: 9,900
- Website: www.sulechow.pl

Gmina Sulechów is an urban-rural gmina (administrative district) in Zielona Góra County, Lubusz Voivodeship, in western Poland. Its seat is the town of Sulechów, which lies approximately 18 kilometres (11 mi) north-east of Zielona Góra.

The gmina covers an area of 236.57 square kilometres (91.3 sq mi), and as of 2024 its total population is 23,935.

== Villages ==
Apart from the town of Sulechów, Gmina Sulechów contains the villages and settlements of Boryń, Brody, Brzezie (Pomorsko), Brzezie (Sulechów), Buków, Cigacice, Głogusz, Górki Małe, Górzykowo, Kalsk, Karczyn, Kije, Klępsk, Krężoły, Kruszyna, Laskowo, Łęgowo, Leśna Góra, Mozów, Nowy Klępsk, Nowy Świat, Obłotne, Okunin, Pomorsko, Przygubiel and Szabliska.

== Neighbouring gminas ==
Gmina Sulechów is bordered by the gminas of Babimost, Czerwieńsk, Kargowa, Skąpe, Świebodzin, Szczaniec, Trzebiechów, Zabór and city of Zielona Góra.

== Twin towns – sister cities ==
Gmina Sulechów is twinned with:

- Criuleni, Moldova
- Fürstenwalde, Germany
- Rushmoor, England, United Kingdom

== See also ==
- Honorary citizens of Gmina Sulechów
