= Pieniężnica =

- Village
- Location within Poland
- Coordinates: 53°51′25″N 16°57′45″E
- Country: Poland
- Voivodeship: Pomeranian
- County: Człuchów
- Gmina: Rzeczenica
- Population: 392

Pieniężnica [pjɛɲɛ̃ʐˈnit͡sa] is a village in the administrative district of Gmina Rzeczenica, within Człuchów County, Pomeranian Voivodeship, in northern Poland.

For details of the history of the region, see History of Pomerania.
