= Laskowo, Lubusz Voivodeship =

Laskowo
- Settlement
- Location within Poland
- Coordinates: 52°2′53″N 15°31′25″E
- Country: Poland
- Voivodeship: Lubusz
- County: Zielona Góra
- Gmina: Sulechów

Laskowo ([lasˈkɔvɔ]; German: Suppmühle) is a settlement in the administrative district of Gmina Sulechów, within Zielona Góra County, Lubusz Voivodeship, in western Poland.
