= Grodzisko, Pomeranian Voivodeship =

Grodzisko
- Village
- Location within Poland
- Coordinates: 53°43′17″N 17°8′1″E
- Country: Poland
- Voivodeship: Pomeranian
- County: Człuchów
- Gmina: Rzeczenica
- Population: 15

Grodzisko [ɡrɔˈd͡ʑiskɔ] is a village in the administrative district of Gmina Rzeczenica, within Człuchów County, Pomeranian Voivodeship, in northern Poland.

For details of the history of the region, see History of Pomerania.
