= Głogusz =

- Village
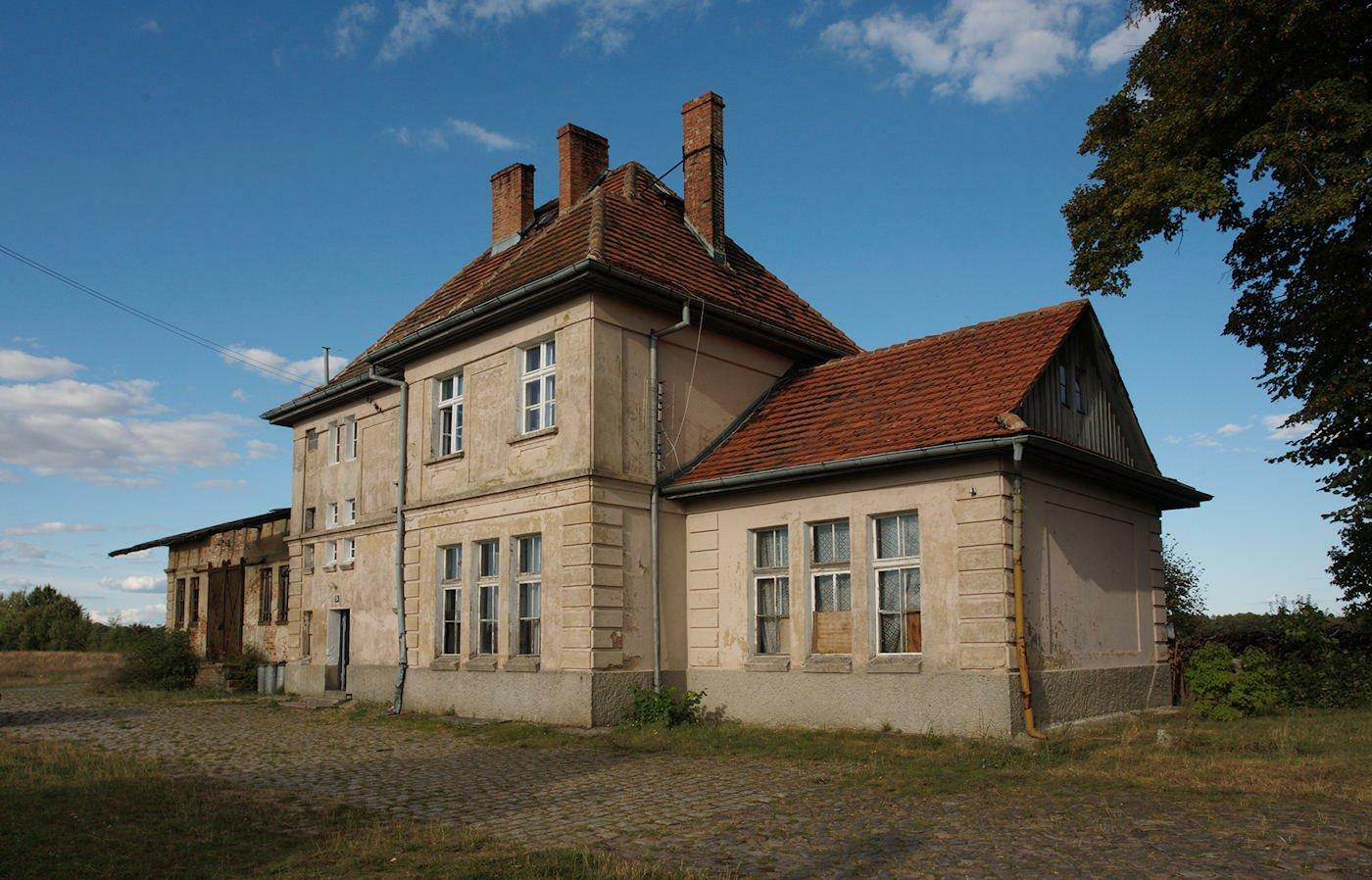
- Railway stop

- Location within Poland
- Coordinates: 52°7′N 15°31′E
- Country: Poland
- Voivodeship: Lubusz
- County: Zielona Góra
- Gmina: Sulechów
- Population: 160

Głogusz [ˈɡwɔɡuʂ] is a village in the administrative district of Gmina Sulechów, within Zielona Góra County, Lubusz Voivodeship, in western Poland.
