= Okunin =

- Village
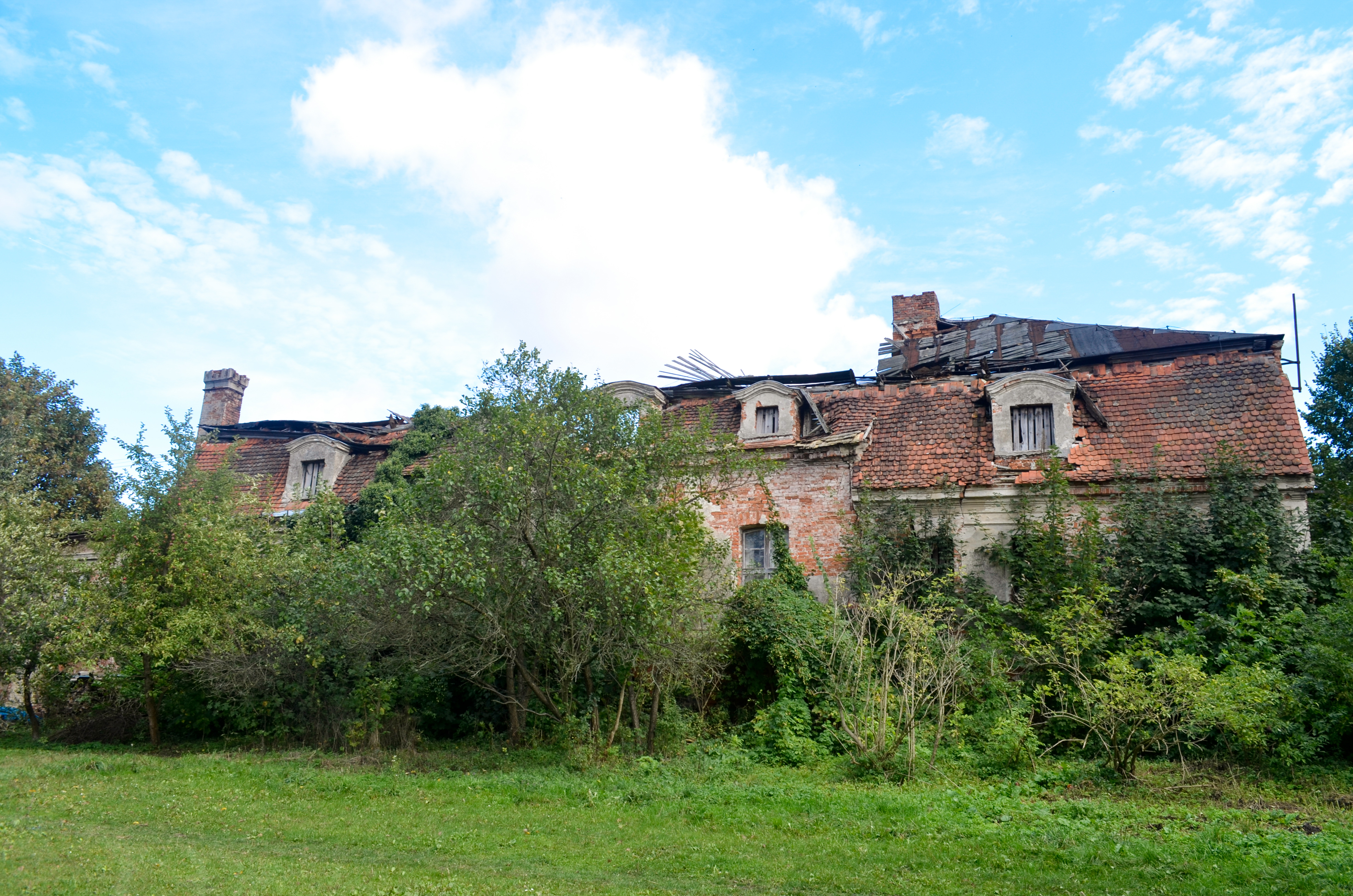
- Manor ruins

- Location within Poland
- Coordinates: 52°6′N 15°44′E
- Country: Poland
- Voivodeship: Lubusz
- County: Zielona Góra
- Gmina: Sulechów

Okunin [ɔˈkunin] is a village in the administrative district of Gmina Sulechów, within Zielona Góra County, Lubusz Voivodeship, in western Poland.
