= Brody, Zielona Góra County =

Brody
- Village
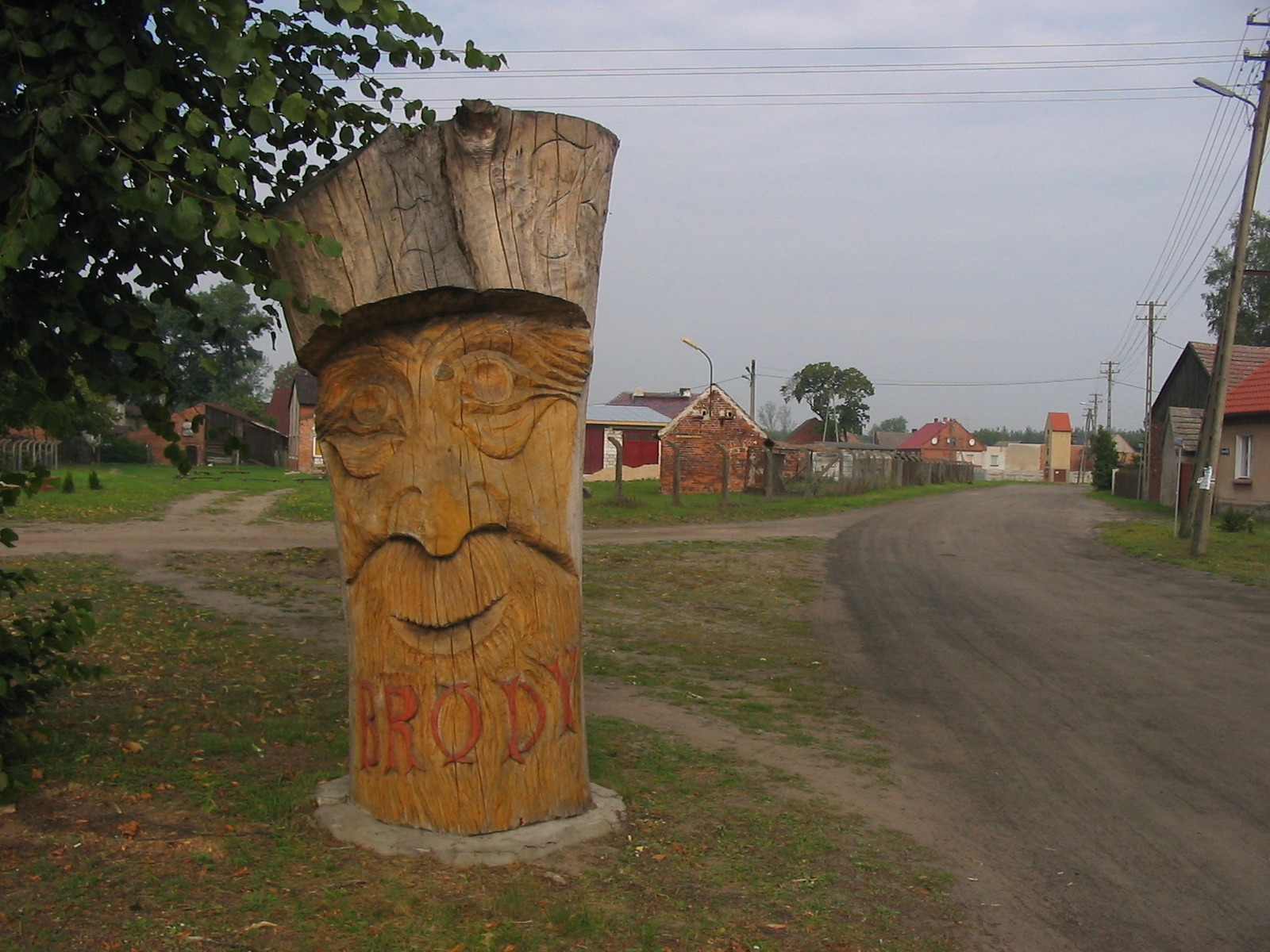

- Location within Poland
- Coordinates: 52°4′N 15°26′E
- Country: Poland
- Voivodeship: Lubusz
- County: Zielona Góra
- Gmina: Sulechów
- Population: 640

Brody [ˈbrɔdɨ] is a village in the administrative district of Gmina Sulechów, within Zielona Góra County, Lubusz Voivodeship, in western Poland.

The Brody Ferry, a cable ferry, crosses the River Oder at Brody.
