= Szabliska =

- Settlement
- Location within Poland
- Coordinates: 52°5′10″N 15°30′55″E
- Country: Poland
- Voivodeship: Lubusz
- County: Zielona Góra
- Gmina: Sulechów

Szabliska [ʂaˈbliska] is a settlement in the administrative district of Gmina Sulechów, within Zielona Góra County, Lubusz Voivodeship, in western Poland.
