= Obłotne =

- Village
- Location within Poland
- Coordinates: 52°5′N 15°38′E
- Country: Poland
- Voivodeship: Lubusz
- County: Zielona Góra
- Gmina: Sulechów

Obłotne [ɔˈbwɔtnɛ] is a village in the administrative district of Gmina Sulechów, within Zielona Góra County, Lubusz Voivodeship, in western Poland.
