= Dzików, Pomeranian Voivodeship =

Dzików
- Village
- Location within Poland
- Coordinates: 53°45′10″N 17°1′40″E
- Country: Poland
- Voivodeship: Pomeranian
- County: Człuchów
- Gmina: Rzeczenica
- Population: 21

Dzików [ˈd͡ʑikuf] is a village in the administrative district of Gmina Rzeczenica, within Człuchów County, Pomeranian Voivodeship, in northern Poland.

For details of the history of the region, see History of Pomerania.
