= Jelnia, Pomeranian Voivodeship =

Jelnia
- Settlement
- Location within Poland
- Coordinates: 53°45′25″N 16°58′33″E
- Country: Poland
- Voivodeship: Pomeranian
- County: Człuchów
- Gmina: Rzeczenica

Jelnia [ˈjɛlɲa] is a settlement in the administrative district of Gmina Rzeczenica, within Człuchów County, Pomeranian Voivodeship, in northern Poland.

For details of the history of the region, see History of Pomerania.
