= Międzybórz, Pomeranian Voivodeship =

Międzybórz
- Village
- Location within Poland
- Coordinates: 53°46′34″N 16°59′57″E
- Country: Poland
- Voivodeship: Pomeranian
- County: Człuchów
- Gmina: Rzeczenica
- Population: 391

Międzybórz [mjɛnˈd͡zɨbuʂ] is a village in the administrative district of Gmina Rzeczenica, within Człuchów County, Pomeranian Voivodeship, in northern Poland.

For details of the history of the region, see History of Pomerania.
