= Boryń, Lubusz Voivodeship =

Boryń
- Settlement
- Location within Poland
- Coordinates: 52°3′15″N 15°33′58″E
- Country: Poland
- Voivodeship: Lubusz
- County: Zielona Góra
- Gmina: Sulechów

Boryń [ˈbɔrɨɲ] is a settlement in the administrative district of Gmina Sulechów, within Zielona Góra County, Lubusz Voivodeship, in western Poland.
