= Lestnica, Pomeranian Voivodeship =

Lestnica
- Settlement
- Location within Poland
- Coordinates: 53°46′56″N 17°5′14″E
- Country: Poland
- Voivodeship: Pomeranian
- County: Człuchów
- Gmina: Rzeczenica
- Population: 6

Lestnica [lɛstˈnit͡sa] is a settlement in the administrative district of Gmina Rzeczenica, within Człuchów County, Pomeranian Voivodeship, in northern Poland.

For details of the history of the region, see History of Pomerania.
