= Gwieździn =

- Village
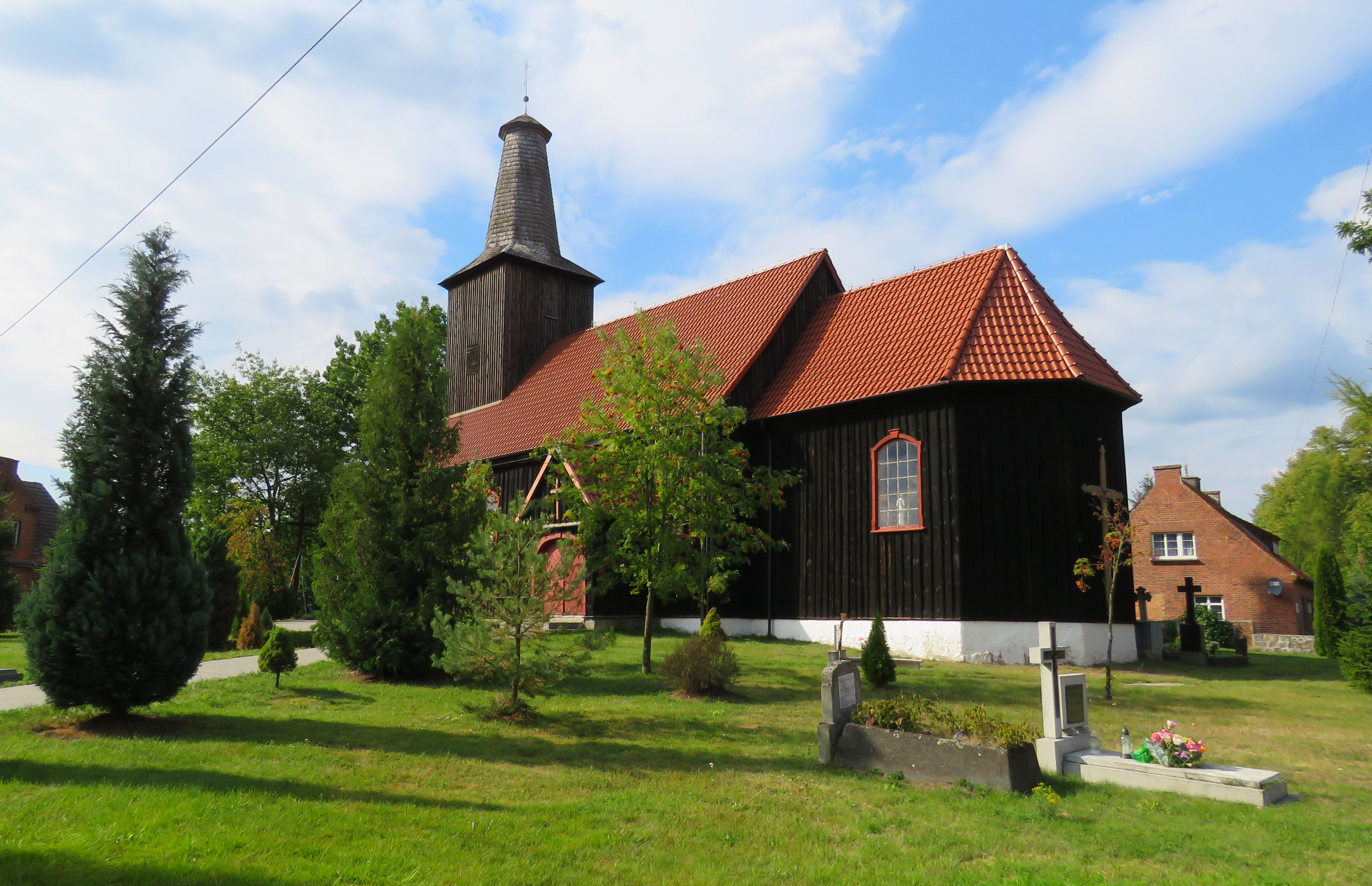
- Saint Martin church in Gwieździn

- Location within Poland
- Coordinates: 53°44′19″N 17°11′22″E
- Country: Poland
- Voivodeship: Pomeranian
- County: Człuchów
- Gmina: Rzeczenica
- Population: 375
- Time zone: UTC+1 (CET)
  - Summer (DST): UTC+2 (CEST)
- Vehicle registration: GCZ

Gwieździn [ˈɡvjɛʑd͡ʑin] (German: Förstenau) is a village in the administrative district of Gmina Rzeczenica, within Człuchów County, Pomeranian Voivodeship, in northern Poland. It is located within the historic region of Pomerania.

Gwieździn was a royal village of the Polish Crown, administratively located in the Człuchów County in the Pomeranian Voivodeship.
