= Kruszyna, Lubusz Voivodeship =

Kruszyna
- Village
- Location within Poland
- Coordinates: 52°4′25″N 15°38′29″E
- Country: Poland
- Voivodeship: Lubusz
- County: Zielona Góra
- Gmina: Sulechów

Kruszyna [kruˈʂɨna] is a village in the administrative district of Gmina Sulechów, within Zielona Góra County, Lubusz Voivodeship, in western Poland.
