= Krężoły, Lubusz Voivodeship =

Krężoły
- Village
- Location within Poland
- Coordinates: 52°5′17″N 15°38′34″E
- Country: Poland
- Voivodeship: Lubusz
- County: Zielona Góra
- Gmina: Sulechów

Krężoły [krɛ̃ˈʐɔwɨ] is a village in the administrative district of Gmina Sulechów, within Zielona Góra County, Lubusz Voivodeship, in western Poland.
