= Leśna Góra =

- Village
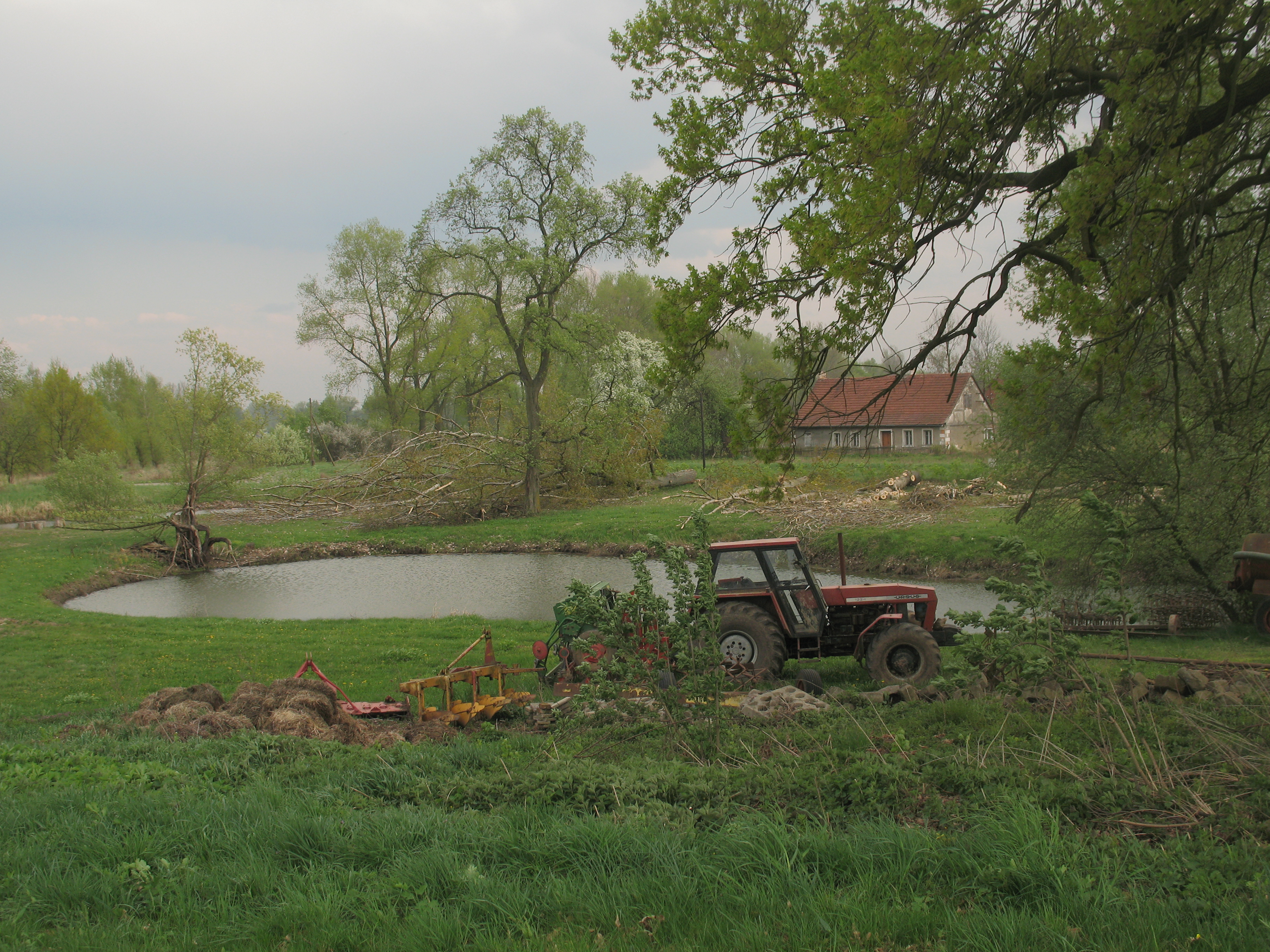
- Leśna Góra, a village on the Oder river in Poland near Zielona Góra

- Location within Poland
- Coordinates: 52°01′33″N 15°37′01″E
- Country: Poland
- Voivodeship: Lubusz
- County: Zielona Góra
- Gmina: Sulechów

Leśna Góra [ˈlɛɕna ˈɡura] is a village in the administrative district of Gmina Sulechów, within Zielona Góra County, Lubusz Voivodeship, in western Poland.
