= Brzezie (Pomorsko) =

- Village
- Location within Poland
- Coordinates: 52°4′57″N 15°28′13″E
- Country: Poland
- Voivodeship: Lubusz
- County: Zielona Góra
- Gmina: Sulechów

Brzezie [ˈbʐɛʑɛ] is a village in the administrative district of Gmina Sulechów, within Zielona Góra County, Lubusz Voivodeship, in western Poland. It is sometimes called Brzezie koło Pomorska ("Brzezie near Pomorsko") to distinguish it from another Brzezie in the district, Brzezie koło Sulechowa ("Brzezie near Sulechów").
