= Rzeczenica =

- Village
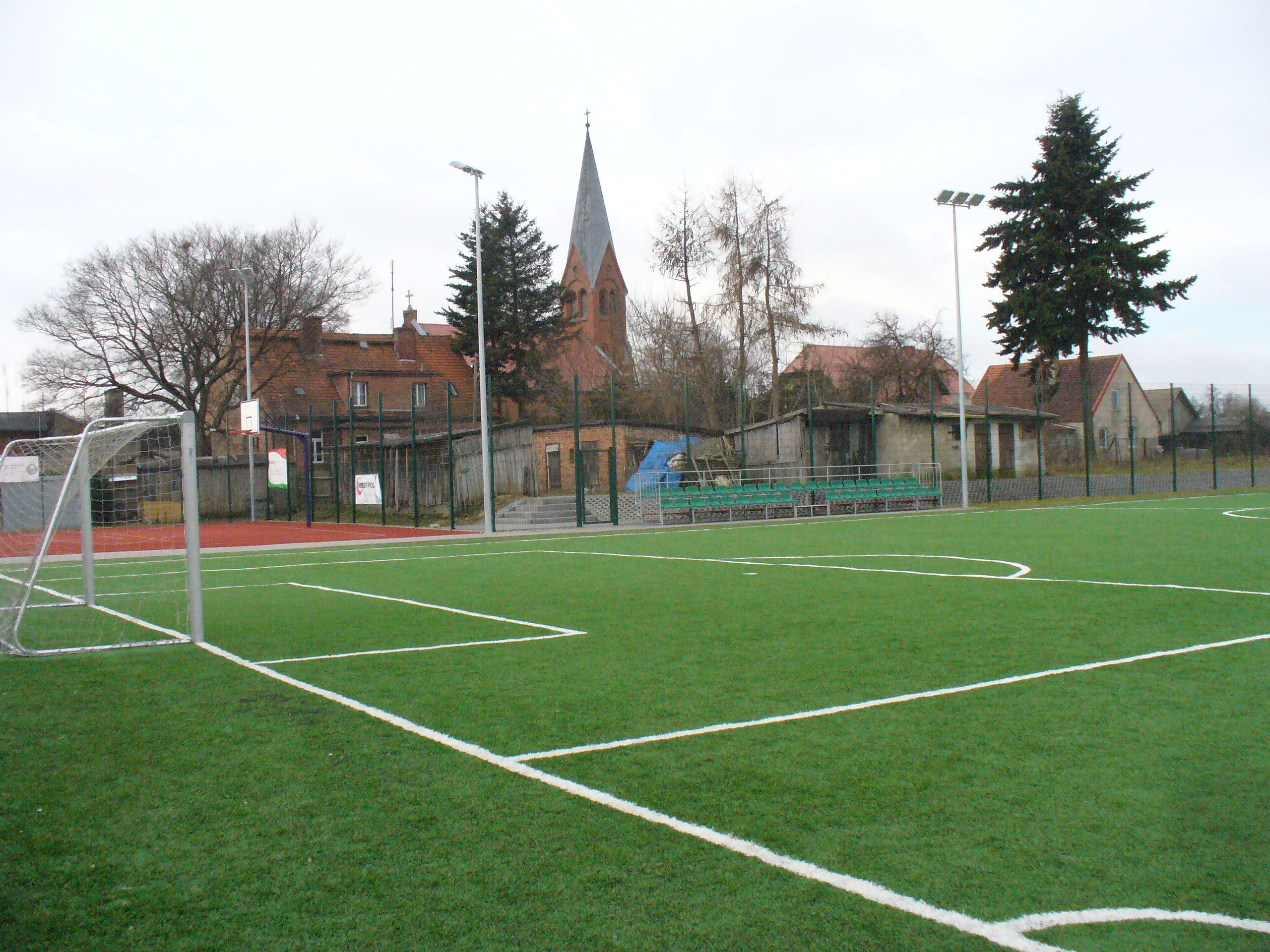

- Location within Poland
- Coordinates: 53°45′25″N 17°6′24″E
- Country: Poland
- Voivodeship: Pomeranian
- County: Człuchów
- Gmina: Rzeczenica
- Population: 1,566
- Time zone: UTC+1 (CET)
  - Summer (DST): UTC+2 (CEST)

Rzeczenica [ʐɛt͡ʂɛˈnit͡sa] (German: Stegers) is a village in Człuchów County, Pomeranian Voivodeship, in northwestern Poland. It is the seat of the gmina (administrative district) called Gmina Rzeczenica. It is located within the historic region of Pomerania.

Rzeczenica was a royal village of the Polish Crown, administratively located in the Pomeranian Voivodeship. During World War II the German Nazi administration operated a labor camp for Polish and French prisoners of war from the Stalag II-B prisoner-of-war camp in the village.

The main historic landmark of Rzeczenica is the Sacred Heart church.
