= Łęgowo, Zielona Góra County =

Łęgowo
- Village
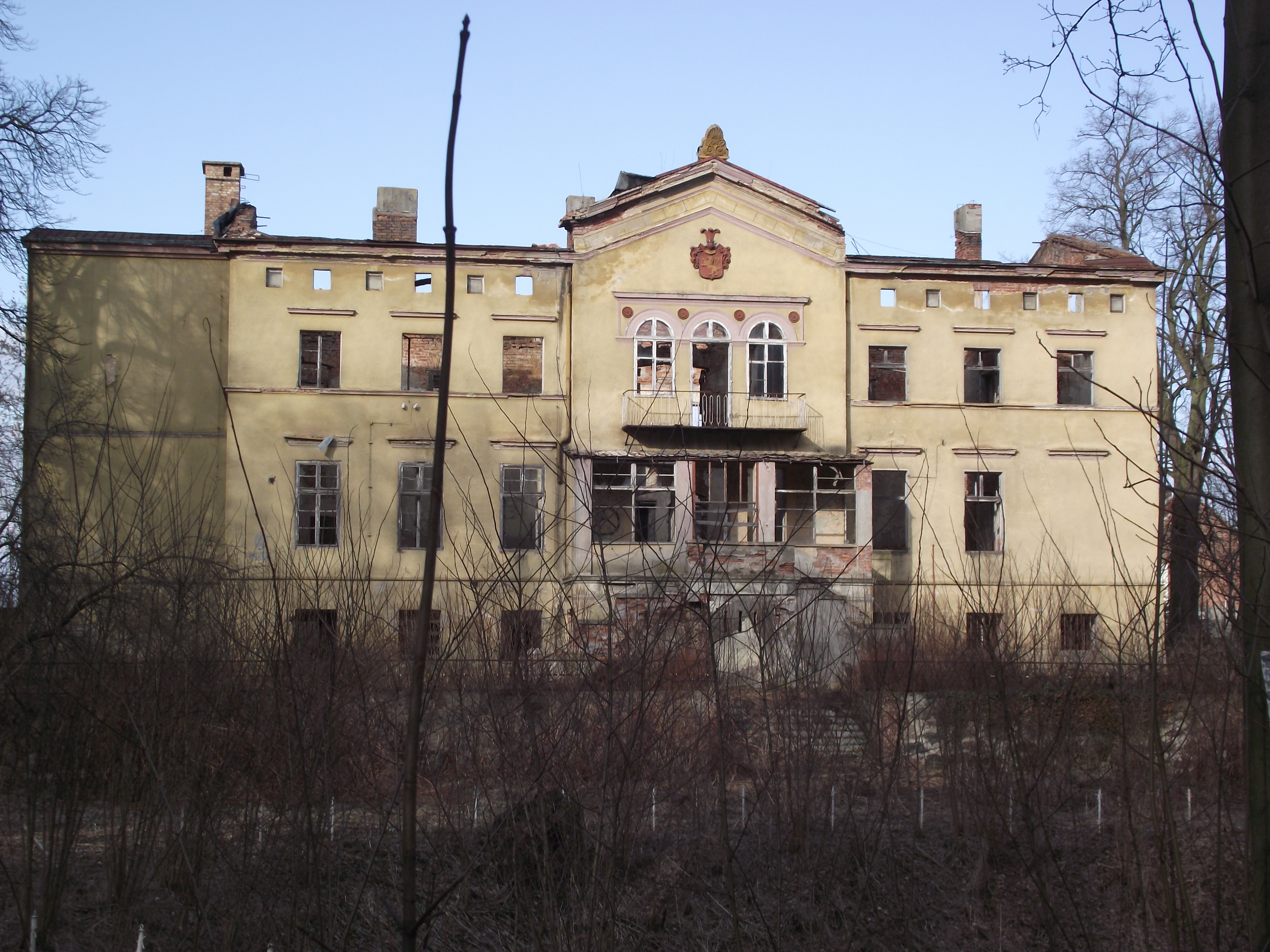

- Location within Poland
- Coordinates: 52°8′N 15°41′E
- Country: Poland
- Voivodeship: Lubusz
- County: Zielona Góra
- Gmina: Sulechów
- Population: 280

Łęgowo [wɛnˈɡɔvɔ] is a village in the administrative district of Gmina Sulechów, within Zielona Góra County, Lubusz Voivodeship, in western Poland.
