= Brzezie, Pomeranian Voivodeship =

Brzezie
- Village
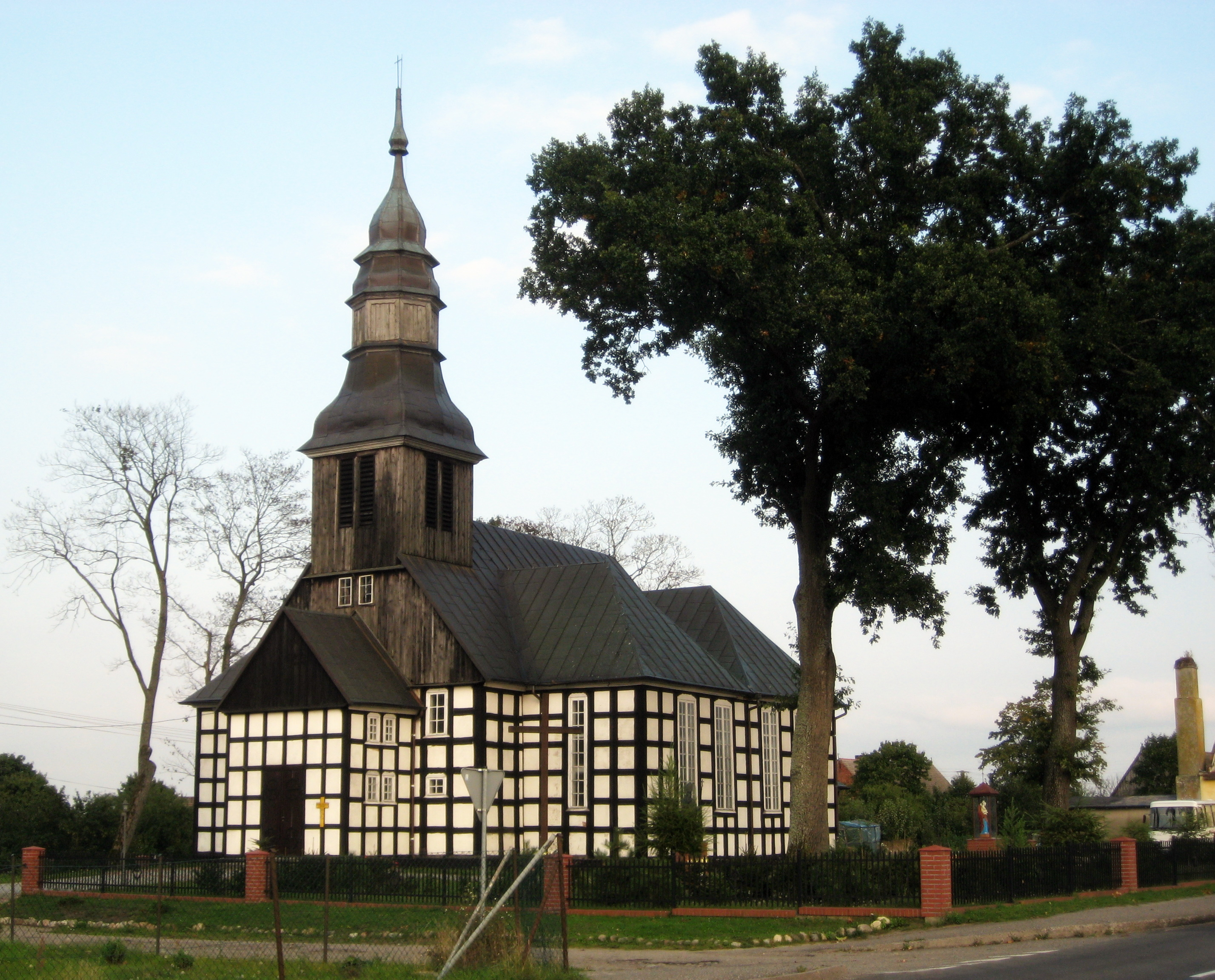
- The church in Brzezie

- Location within Poland
- Coordinates: 53°50′16″N 16°55′16″E
- Country: Poland
- Voivodeship: Pomeranian
- County: Człuchów
- Gmina: Rzeczenica
- Population: 482

Brzezie [ˈbʐɛʑɛ] is a village in the administrative district of Gmina Rzeczenica, within Człuchów County, Pomeranian Voivodeship, in northern Poland.

For details of the history of the region, see History of Pomerania.
