= Bukowo Człuchowskie railway station =

Railway station in Bukowo Człuchowskie, Poland

Coordinates: 53°34′22″N 17°22′17″E

Bukowo Człuchowskie
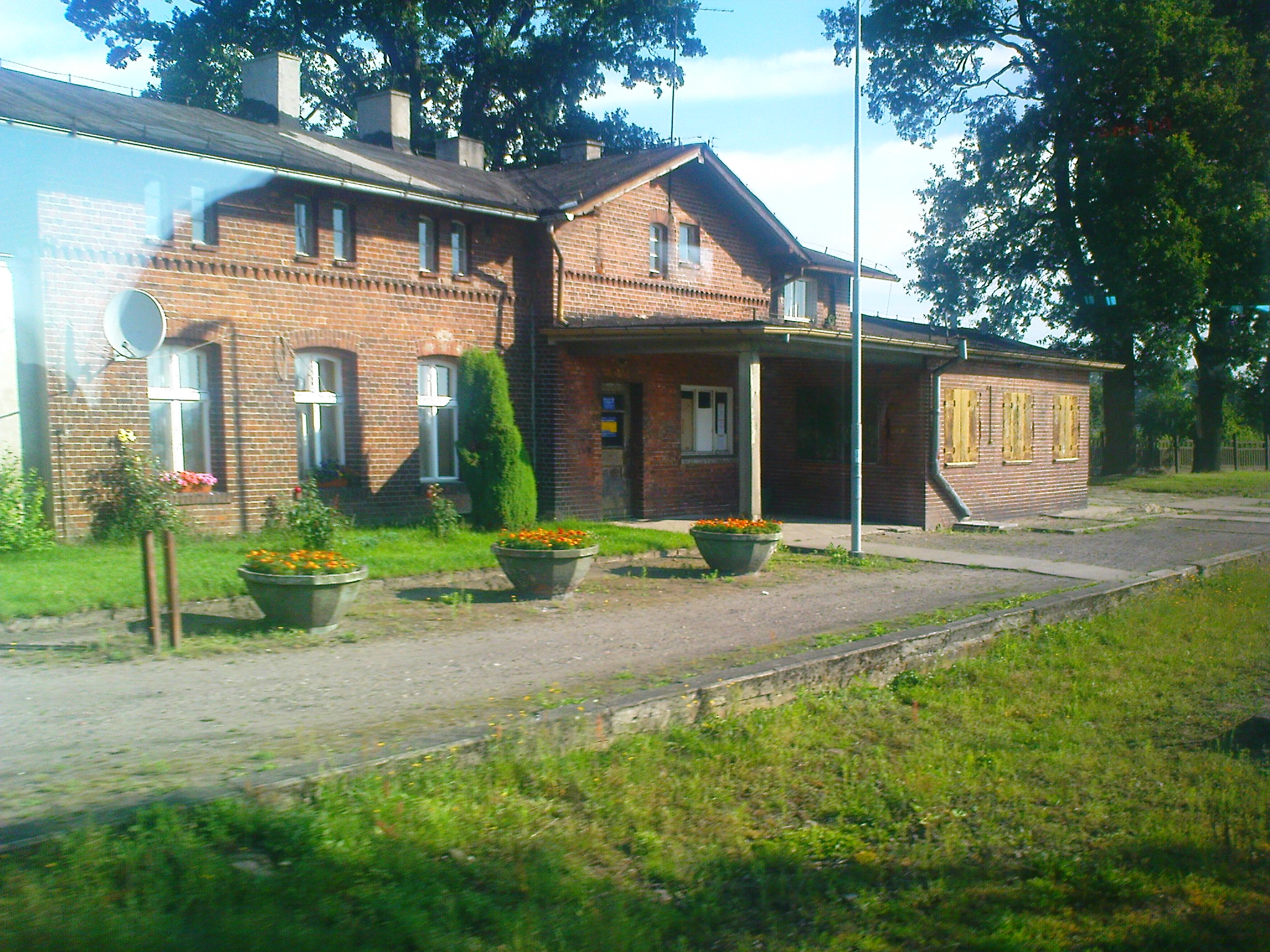

General information
- Location: Bukowo Człuchowskie; Poland
- Owner: Polskie Koleje Państwowe S.A.
- Platforms: 1

Construction
- Structure type: Building: Yes (no longer used); Depot: Never existed Water tower: Never existed

History
- Former names: Buchholz (Grenzm. Posen Westpreußen)
Location

Bukowo Człuchowskie is a PKP railway station in Bukowo Człuchowskie (Pomeranian Voivodeship), Poland.

== Lines crossing the station ==
Start station	End station	Line type
Tczew	Küstrin Kietz	Passenger/Freight
