= Podleś =

Podleś may refer to:

== Places ==
- Mały Podleś
- Nowy Podleś
- Wielki Podleś
- Podleś (PKP station)
- Podles, Silistra Province, a village in Glavinitsa Municipality, Bulgaria

== People ==
- Ewa Podleś (1952–2024), Polish coloratura contralto singer
- Leon Podles, American author
