= KLOK =

Klok or KLOK may refer to:

== People ==
- Gersom Klok (born 1990), Dutch football player
- Hans Klok (born 1969), Dutch magician, illusionist and actor
- Jens Klok (1889–1974), Danish architect
- Lukáš Klok (born 1995), Czech ice hockey player
- Marc Klok (born 1993), Dutch-born Indonesian football player
- Marko Klok (born 1968), Dutch volleyball player

== Radio stations ==
- KLOK (AM), in San Jose, California, broadcasting a World Ethnic format
- KLOK-FM, in Greenfield, California, broadcasting a Regional Mexican format
- KOSF, a radio station (103.7 FM) licensed to San Francisco, California, United States, which used the call sign KLOK-FM from January 1984 to August 1987

== See also ==
- Klock
- Kloc (disambiguation)
- KLOQ (disambiguation)
- Clock (disambiguation)
- CLOC (disambiguation)
