= Korne, Kościerzyna County =

Korne
- Village
- Location within Poland
- Coordinates: 54°8′7″N 17°51′32″E
- Country: Poland
- Voivodeship: Pomeranian
- County: Kościerzyna
- Gmina: Kościerzyna
- Population: 495
- Time zone: UTC+1 (CET)
  - Summer (DST): UTC+2 (CEST)

Korne [ˈkɔrnɛ] is a village in the administrative district of Gmina Kościerzyna, within Kościerzyna County, Pomeranian Voivodeship, in northern Poland. It is located within the ethnocultural region of Kashubia in the historic region of Pomerania.

Korne was a royal village of the Polish Crown, administratively located in the Tczew County in the Pomeranian Voivodeship.

During the German occupation of Poland (World War II), the Germans murdered the pre-war Polish wójt of Korne (local administration official) in the nearby village of Gostomie as part of the Intelligenzaktion.
