= Fingrowa Huta =

Fingrowa Huta Fingrowô Hëta
- Village

- Location within Poland
- Coordinates: 54°9′28″N 17°55′45″E
- Country: Poland
- Voivodeship: Pomeranian
- County: Kościerzyna
- Gmina: Kościerzyna

Population
  - Total: 36

Fingrowa Huta [finˈɡrɔva ˈxuta] (Kashubian: Fingrowô Hëta) is a village in the administrative district of Gmina Kościerzyna, within Kościerzyna County, Pomeranian Voivodeship, in northern Poland.

For details of the history of the region, see History of Pomerania.
