= Wilczewo =

Wilczewo may refer to the following places:

- Wilczewo, Kuyavian-Pomeranian Voivodeship (north-central Poland)
- Wilczewo, Podlaskie Voivodeship (north-east Poland)
- Wilczewo, Kościerzyna County in Pomeranian Voivodeship (north Poland)
- Wilczewo, Sztum County in Pomeranian Voivodeship (north Poland)
