= Zarośle, Pomeranian Voivodeship =

Zarośle
- Settlement
- Location within Poland
- Coordinates: 53°59′48″N 17°47′1″E
- Country: Poland
- Voivodeship: Pomeranian
- County: Kościerzyna
- Gmina: Dziemiany

Zarośle [zaˈrɔɕlɛ] is a settlement in the administrative district of Gmina Dziemiany, within Kościerzyna County, Pomeranian Voivodeship, in northern Poland.

For details of the history of the region, see History of Pomerania.
