= Grzybowo, Pomeranian Voivodeship =

Grzybowo
- Village
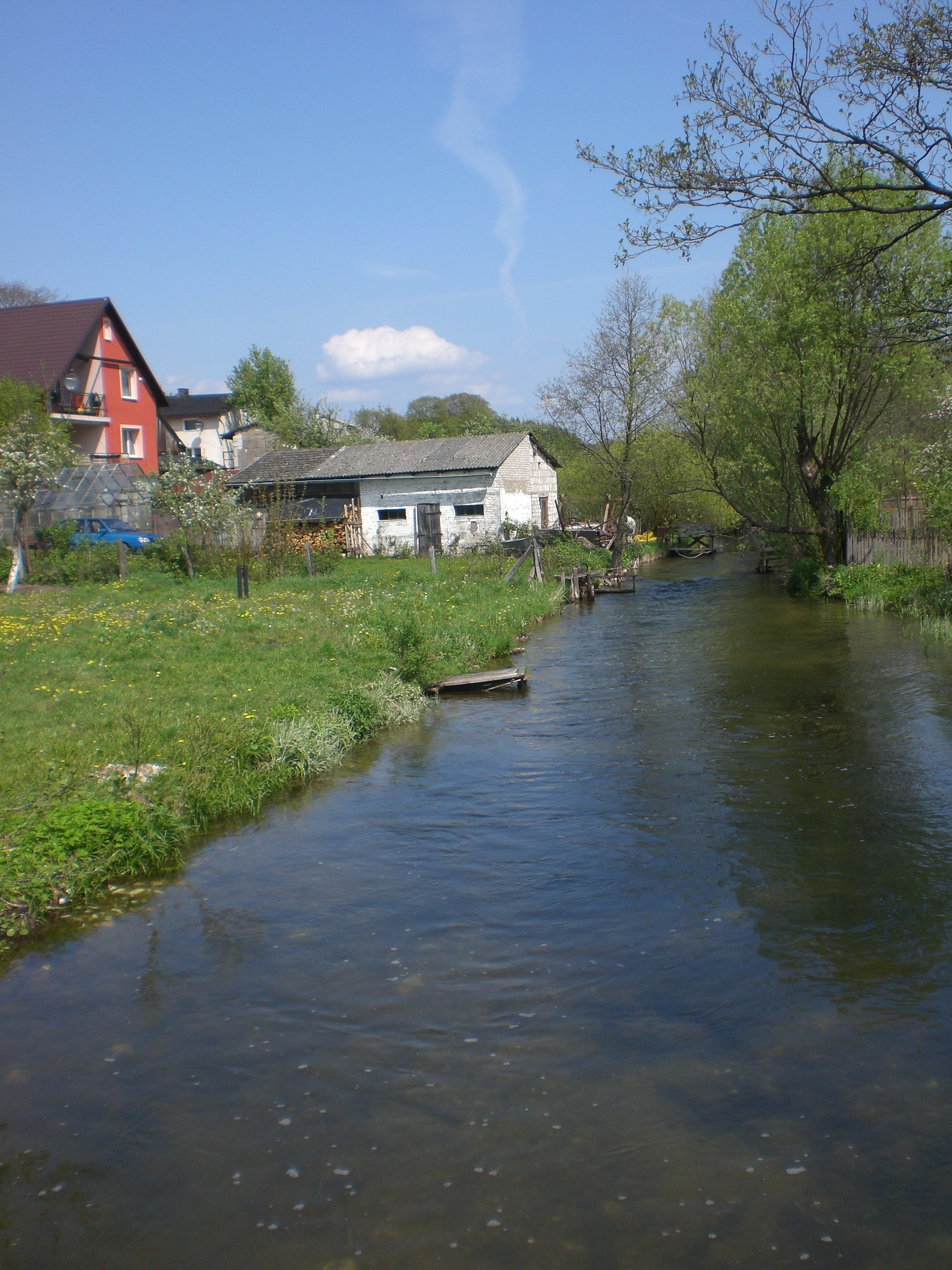
- Trzebiocha river in Grzybowo

- Location within Poland
- Coordinates: 54°4′35″N 17°54′9″E
- Country: Poland
- Voivodeship: Pomeranian
- County: Kościerzyna
- Gmina: Kościerzyna
- Population: 173

Grzybowo [ɡʐɨˈbɔvɔ] is a village in the administrative district of Gmina Kościerzyna, within Kościerzyna County, Pomeranian Voivodeship, in northern Poland.

== See also ==
- History of Pomerania
