= Czarlina =

Village in Poland

Czarlina Czôrlëna
- Village

- Location within Poland
- Coordinates: 54°1′7″N 17°54′38″E
- Country: Poland
- Voivodeship: Pomeranian
- County: Kościerzyna
- Gmina: Kościerzyna
- Population: 139

Czarlina [t͡ʂarˈlina] (Kashubian: Czôrlëna) is a village in the administrative district of Gmina Kościerzyna, within Kościerzyna County, Pomeranian Voivodeship, in northern Poland.

For details of the history of the region, see History of Pomerania.
