= Lizaki =

- Village
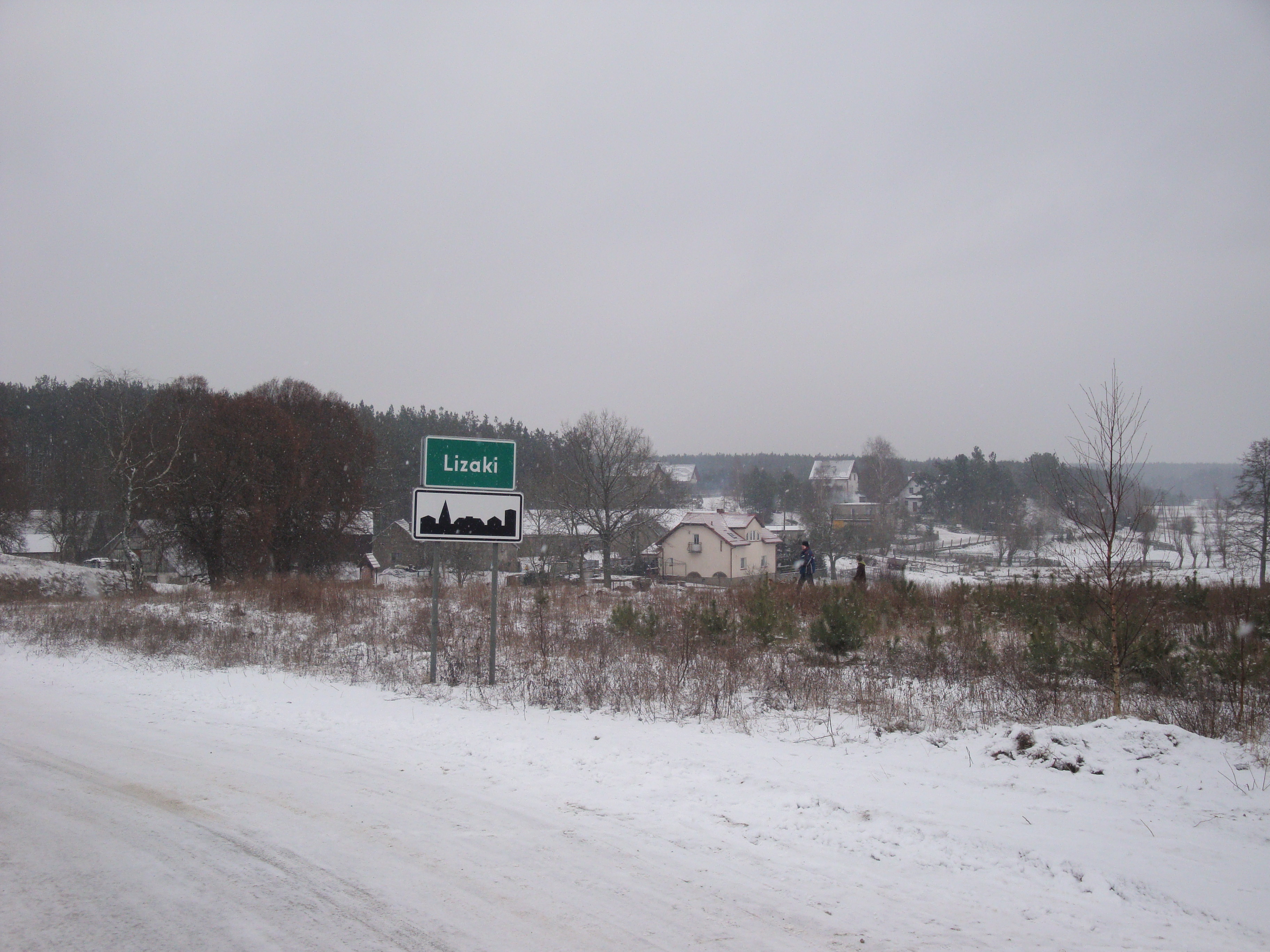

- Location within Poland
- Coordinates: 54°4′42″N 17°55′25″E
- Country: Poland
- Voivodeship: Pomeranian
- County: Kościerzyna
- Gmina: Kościerzyna
- Population: 50

Lizaki [liˈzaki] is a village in the administrative district of Gmina Kościerzyna, within Kościerzyna County, Pomeranian Voivodeship, in northern Poland.

For details of the history of the region, see History of Pomerania.
