= Gościeradz =

Gościeradz may refer to the following places:

- Gościeradz, Kuyavian-Pomeranian Voivodeship (north-central Poland)
- Gościeradz, Kościerzyna County in Pomeranian Voivodeship (north Poland)
- Gościeradz, Słupsk County in Pomeranian Voivodeship (north Poland)
