= Czarne Pustkowie =

Czarne Pustkowie Czôrné Pùstkòwié
- Hamlet
- Location within Poland
- Coordinates: 54°9′56″N 17°51′46″E
- Country: Poland
- Voivodeship: Pomeranian
- County: Kościerzyna
- Gmina: Kościerzyna

Czarne Pustkowie [ˈt͡ʂarnɛ pustˈkɔvjɛ] (Kashubian: Czôrné Pùstkòwié) is a hamlet in the administrative district of Gmina Kościerzyna, within Kościerzyna County, Pomeranian Voivodeship, in northern Poland.

For details of the history of the region, see History of Pomerania.
