= Wieprznica =

- Village
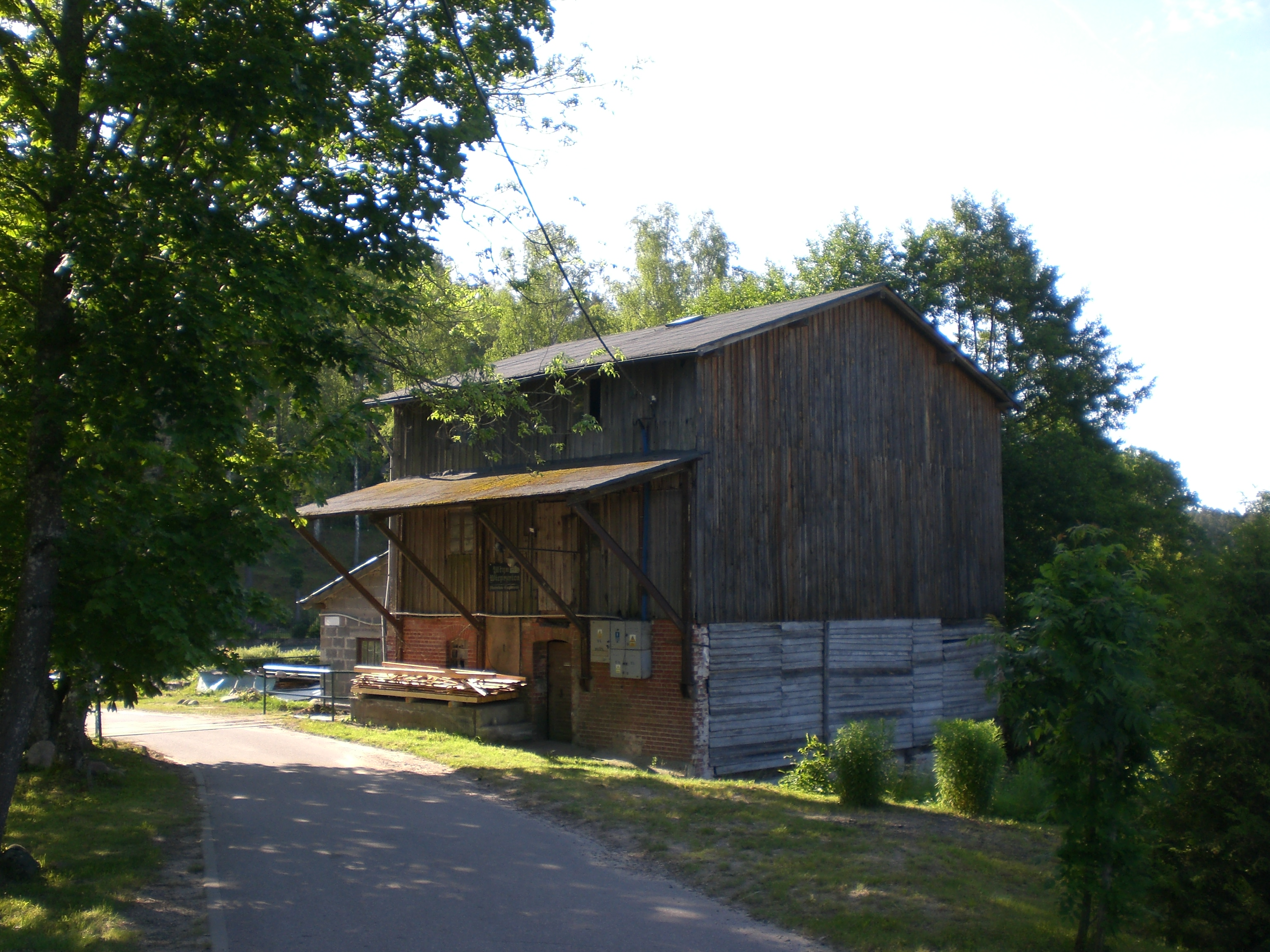
- Wieprznica, młyn

- Location within Poland
- Coordinates: 54°8′54″N 17°54′0″E
- Country: Poland
- Voivodeship: Pomeranian
- County: Kościerzyna
- Gmina: Kościerzyna
- Population: 116

Wieprznica [vjɛpʂˈnit͡sa] is a village in the administrative district of Gmina Kościerzyna, within Kościerzyna County, Pomeranian Voivodeship, in northern Poland.

For details of the history of the region, see History of Pomerania.
