= Zielenin =

- Village
- Location within Poland
- Coordinates: 54°7′20″N 18°5′13″E
- Country: Poland
- Voivodeship: Pomeranian
- County: Kościerzyna
- Gmina: Kościerzyna
- Population: 162

Zielenin [ʑɛˈlɛnin] is a village in the administrative district of Gmina Kościerzyna, Kościerzyna County, Pomeranian Voivodeship, in northern Poland.

== See also ==
- History of Pomerania
