= Kania, Pomeranian Voivodeship =

Kania
- Settlement
- Location within Poland
- Coordinates: 54°8′22″N 17°53′32″E
- Country: Poland
- Voivodeship: Pomeranian
- County: Kościerzyna
- Gmina: Kościerzyna

Kania [ˈkaɲa] is a settlement in the administrative district of Gmina Kościerzyna, within Kościerzyna County, Pomeranian Voivodeship, in northern Poland.

For details of the history of the region, see History of Pomerania.
