= Owśniczka =

Owśniczka Òwsniczka
- Przysiółek
- Location within Poland
- Coordinates: 54°10′1″N 17°53′22″E
- Country: Poland
- Voivodeship: Pomeranian
- County: Kościerzyna
- Gmina: Kościerzyna

Owśniczka [ɔfɕˈnit͡ʂka] (Kashubian: Òwsniczka) is a przysiółek in the administrative district of Gmina Kościerzyna, within Kościerzyna County, Pomeranian Voivodeship, in northern Poland.

For details of the history of the region, see History of Pomerania.
