= Białe Błoto =

Białe Błoto may refer to the following places in Poland:

- Białe Błoto, Lower Silesian Voivodeship (south-west Poland)
- Białe Błoto, Pułtusk County in Masovian Voivodeship (east-central Poland)
- Białe Błoto, Sierpc County in Masovian Voivodeship (east-central Poland)
- Białe Błoto, Gmina Dziemiany in Pomeranian Voivodeship (north Poland)
- Białe Błoto, Gmina Karsin in Pomeranian Voivodeship (north Poland)
- Białe Błoto, Sztum County in Pomeranian Voivodeship (north Poland)
