= Juszki =

- Village
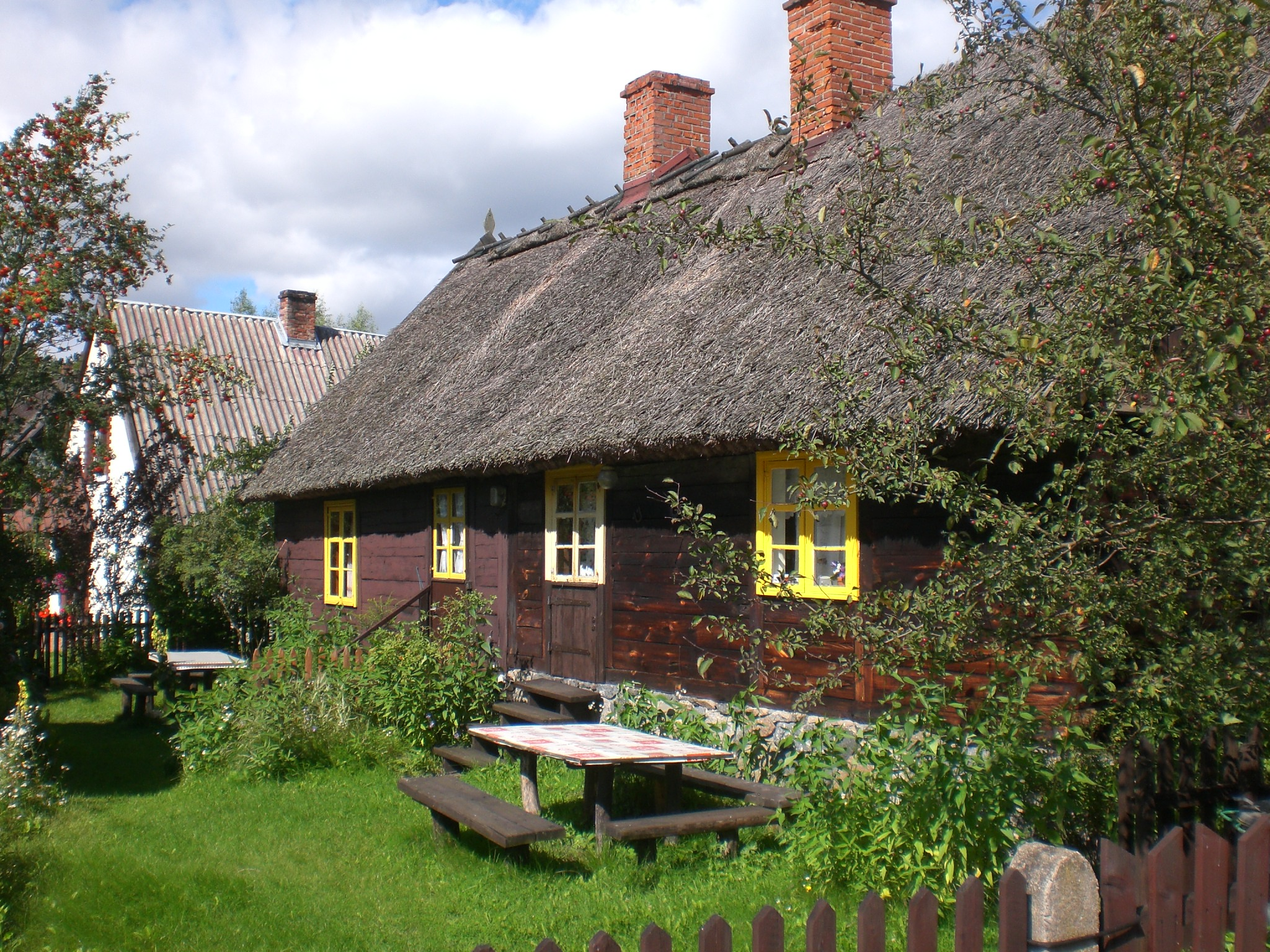

- Location within Poland
- Coordinates: 54°3′7″N 17°58′18″E
- Country: Poland
- Voivodeship: Pomeranian
- County: Kościerzyna
- Gmina: Kościerzyna
- Population: 102 (2,008)

Juszki [ˈjuʂki] is a village in the administrative district of Gmina Kościerzyna, within Kościerzyna County, Pomeranian Voivodeship, in northern Poland.

For details of the history of the region, see History of Pomerania.
