= Wawrzynowo =

- Settlement
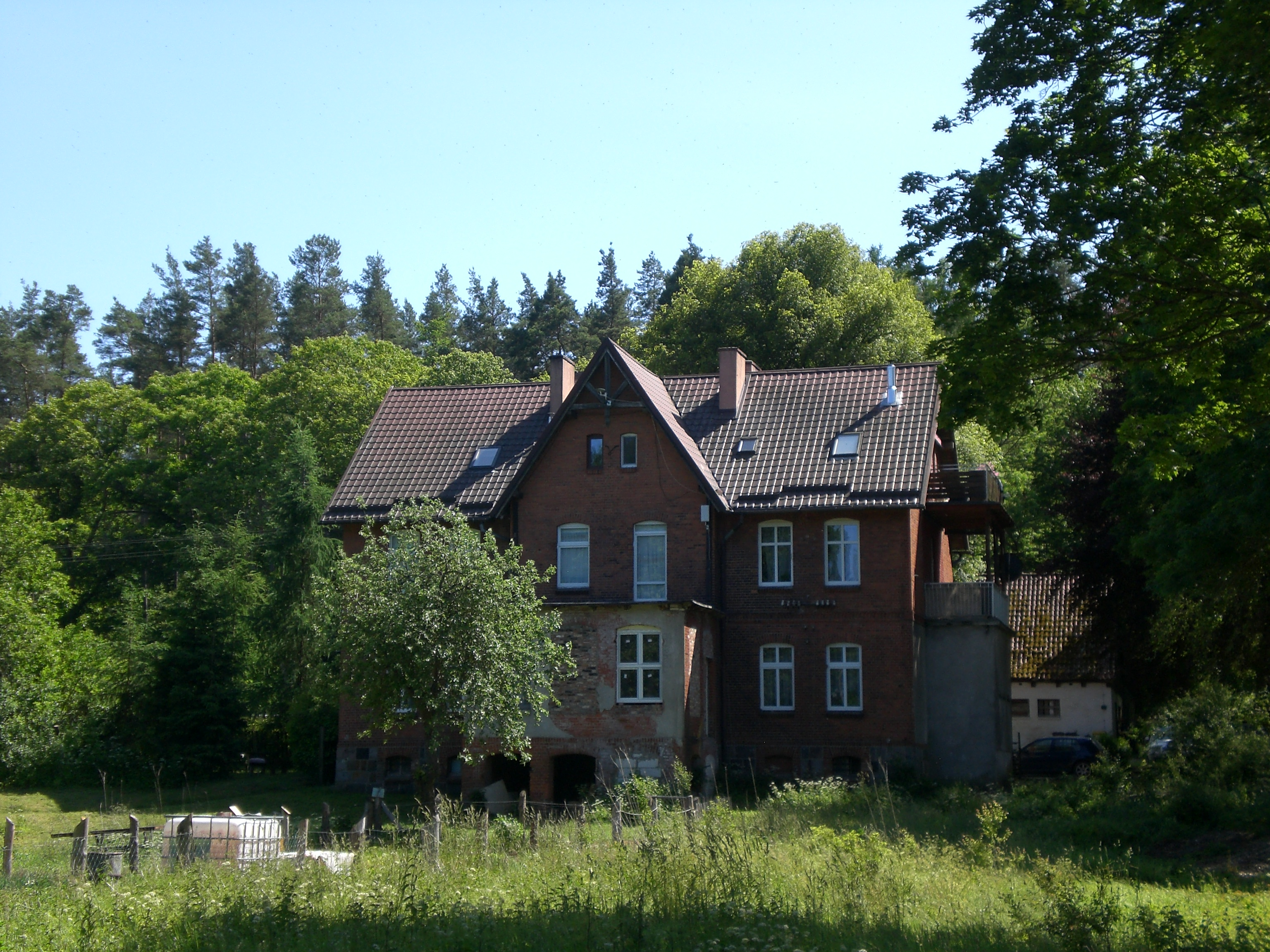
- Wawrzynowo

- Location within Poland
- Coordinates: 54°2′37″N 17°53′49″E
- Country: Poland
- Voivodeship: Pomeranian
- County: Kościerzyna
- Gmina: Kościerzyna

Wawrzynowo [vavʐɨˈnɔvɔ] is a settlement in the administrative district of Gmina Kościerzyna, within Kościerzyna County, Pomeranian Voivodeship, in northern Poland.

For details of the history of the region, see History of Pomerania.
