= Dębogóry =

Dębogóry Dãbògórë
- Village

- Location within Poland
- Coordinates: 54°4′13″N 18°4′15″E
- Country: Poland
- Voivodeship: Pomeranian
- County: Kościerzyna
- Gmina: Kościerzyna
- Population: 140

Dębogóry [dɛmbɔˈɡurɨ] (Kashubian: Dãbògórë) is a village in the administrative district of Gmina Kościerzyna, within Kościerzyna County, Pomeranian Voivodeship, in northern Poland.

For details of the history of the region, see History of Pomerania.
