= Nowa Karczma, Gmina Kościerzyna =

Nowa Karczma
- Settlement
- Location within Poland
- Coordinates: 54°7′48″N 17°52′14″E
- Country: Poland
- Voivodeship: Pomeranian
- County: Kościerzyna
- Gmina: Kościerzyna

Nowa Karczma [ˈnɔva ˈkart͡ʂma] is a settlement in the administrative district of Gmina Kościerzyna, within Kościerzyna County, Pomeranian Voivodeship, in northern Poland.

For details of the history of the region, see History of Pomerania.
