= Plesy =

Plesy may refer to the following places in Poland:

- Plęsy, Łódź Voivodeship (central Poland)
- Plęsy, Warmian-Masurian Voivodeship (north Poland)
- Płęsy, Pomeranian Voivodeship (north Poland)
