= Kłobuczyno =

- Village
- Location within Poland
- Coordinates: 54°11′8″N 18°6′0″E
- Country: Poland
- Voivodeship: Pomeranian
- County: Kościerzyna
- Gmina: Kościerzyna
- Population: 490

Kłobuczyno [kwɔbuˈt͡ʂɨnɔ] is a village in the administrative district of Gmina Kościerzyna, within Kościerzyna County, Pomeranian Voivodeship, in northern Poland.

For details of the history of the region, see History of Pomerania.
