= Szludron =

Szludron Szludrón
- Hamlet
- Location within Poland
- Coordinates: 54°2′1″N 17°51′30″E
- Country: Poland
- Voivodeship: Pomeranian
- County: Kościerzyna
- Gmina: Kościerzyna

Szludron [ˈʂludrɔn] (Kashubian: Szludrón) is a settlement in the administrative district of Gmina Kościerzyna, within Kościerzyna County, Pomeranian Voivodeship, in northern Poland.

For details of the history of the region, see History of Pomerania.
