= Wielki Klincz =

- Village
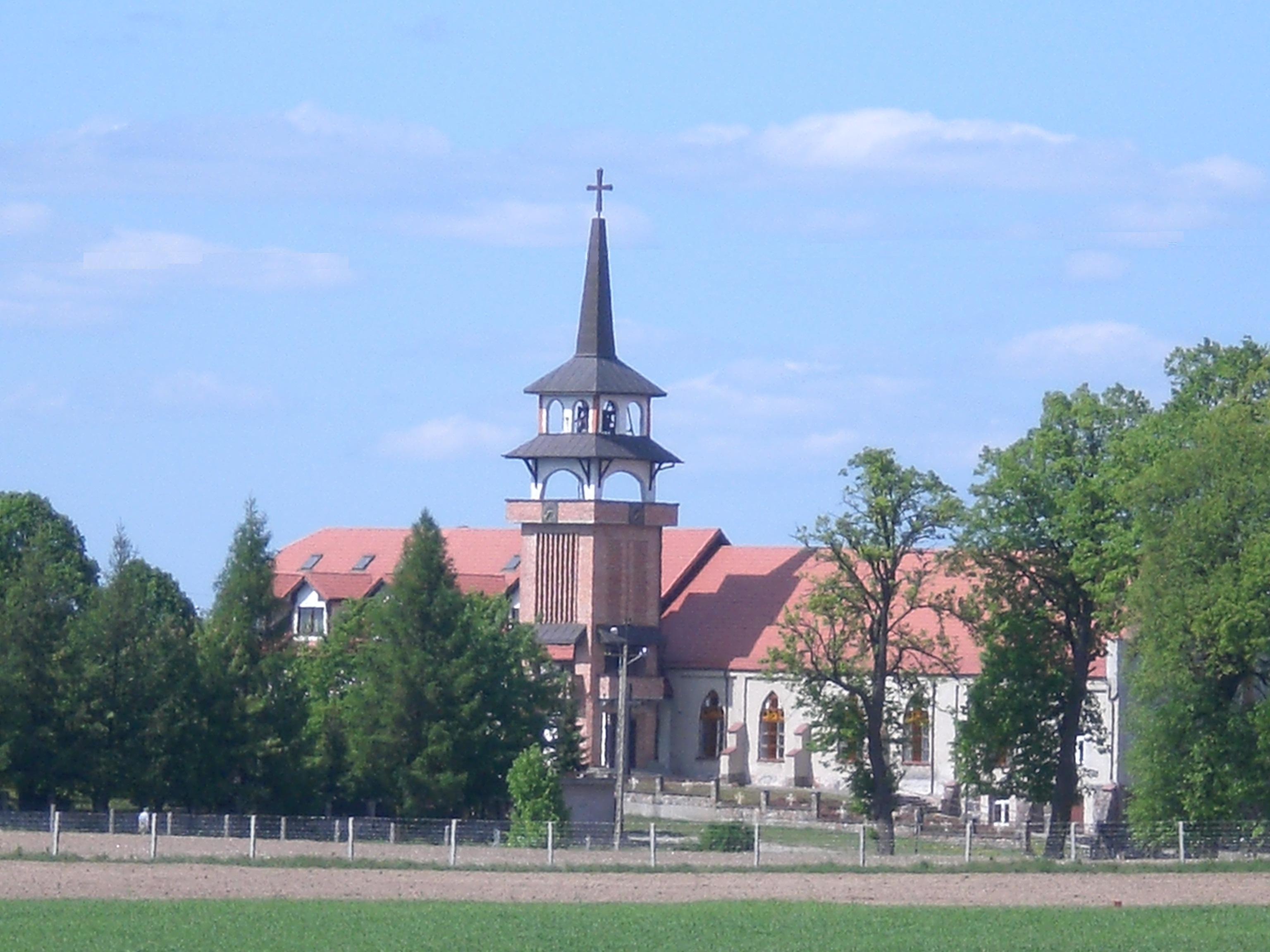
- Church of the Holy Family

- Location within Poland
- Coordinates: 54°6′3″N 18°3′50″E
- Country: Poland
- Voivodeship: Pomeranian
- County: Kościerzyna
- Gmina: Kościerzyna

Population
  - Total: 1,960

Wielki Klincz (Polish pronunciation: [ˈvjɛlkʲi ˈklintʂ]) is a village in the administrative district of Gmina Kościerzyna, within Kościerzyna County, Pomeranian Voivodeship, in northern Poland.

For details of the history of the region, see History of Pomerania.
