= Belfort, Pomeranian Voivodeship =

Belfort
- Village
- Location within Poland
- Coordinates: 54°2′26″N 17°50′50″E
- Country: Poland
- Voivodeship: Pomeranian
- County: Kościerzyna
- Gmina: Dziemiany

Belfort [ˈbɛlfɔrt] is a village that is located in the administrative district of Gmina Dziemiany, within Kościerzyna County, Pomeranian Voivodeship, in northern Poland.

For details of the history of the region, see History of Pomerania.
