= Pełki, Pomeranian Voivodeship =

Pełki
- Settlement
- Location within Poland
- Coordinates: 54°2′26″N 17°41′2″E
- Country: Poland
- Voivodeship: Pomeranian
- County: Kościerzyna
- Gmina: Dziemiany
- Population: 22

Pełki [ˈpɛu̯ki] is a settlement in the administrative district of Gmina Dziemiany, within Kościerzyna County, Pomeranian Voivodeship, in northern Poland.

For details of the history of the region, see History of Pomerania.
