= Wygoda, Kościerzyna County =

Village in Kashubia

Wygoda Wëgòda
- Settlement
- Location within Poland
- Coordinates: 54°10′12″N 17°52′26″E
- Country: Poland
- Voivodeship: Pomeranian
- County: Kościerzyna
- Gmina: Kościerzyna

Wygoda [vɨˈɡɔda] (Kashubian: Wëgòda) is a settlement in the administrative district of Gmina Kościerzyna, within Kościerzyna County, Pomeranian Voivodeship, in northern Poland.

For details of the history of the region, see History of Pomerania.
