= Jastrzębie Dziemiańskie =

- Village
- Location within Poland
- Coordinates: 53°58′36″N 17°48′3″E
- Country: Poland
- Voivodeship: Pomeranian
- County: Kościerzyna
- Gmina: Dziemiany
- Population: 35

Jastrzębie Dziemiańskie [jasˈtʂɛmbjɛ d͡ʑɛˈmjaɲskʲɛ] is a village in the administrative district of Gmina Dziemiany, within Kościerzyna County, Pomeranian Voivodeship, in northern Poland.

For details of the history of the region, see History of Pomerania.
