= Owśnice =

- Village
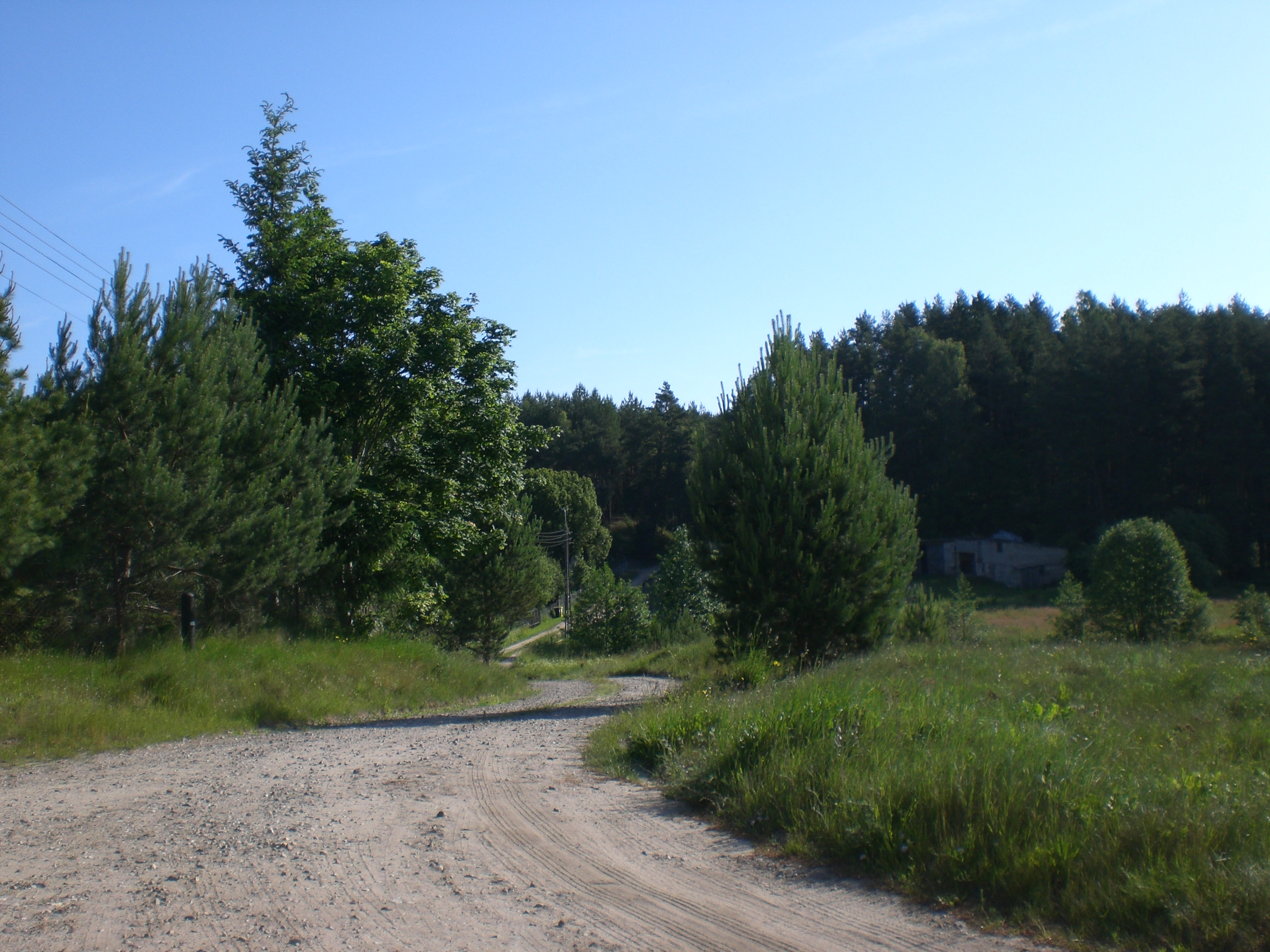
- Owśnice

- Location within Poland
- Coordinates: 54°9′10″N 17°53′29″E
- Country: Poland
- Voivodeship: Pomeranian
- County: Kościerzyna
- Gmina: Kościerzyna

Owśnice [ɔfɕˈnit͡sɛ] is a village in the administrative district of Gmina Kościerzyna, within Kościerzyna County, Pomeranian Voivodeship, in northern Poland.

For details of the history of the region, see History of Pomerania.
