= Kalisz, Pomeranian Voivodeship =

Kalisz
- Village
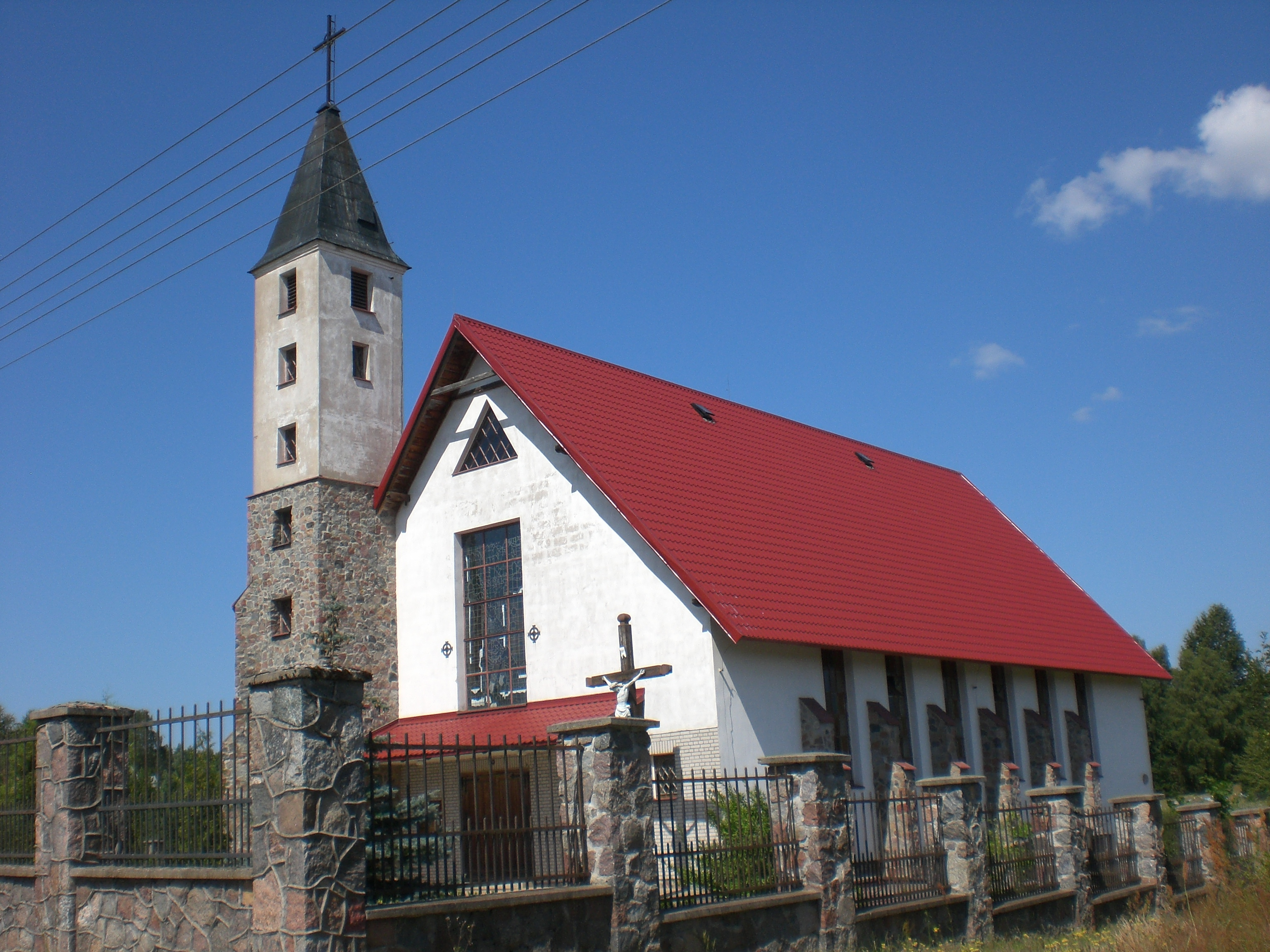
- Saint Roch church in Kalisz

- Location within Poland
- Coordinates: 54°2′40″N 17°47′47″E
- Country: Poland
- Voivodeship: Pomeranian
- County: Kościerzyna
- Gmina: Dziemiany
- Population: 900
- Time zone: UTC+1 (CET)
  - Summer (DST): UTC+2 (CEST)
- Vehicle registration: GKS

Kalisz [ˈkaliʂ] is a village in the administrative district of Gmina Dziemiany, within Kościerzyna County, Pomeranian Voivodeship, in northern Poland. It is located by the Wdzydze Landscape Park in the Tuchola Forest within the historic region of Pomerania.

== History ==
Kalisz was a royal village of the Kingdom of Poland, administratively located in the Tczew County in the Pomeranian Voivodeship. When it was part of the Kingdom of Poland, Kalisz was granted was various privileges in 1681, 1695, 1750, 1755, 1763 and 1765.

During the German occupation of Poland (World War II), the Germans expelled the entire population of the village, which was deported to forced labour.

== Transport ==
The Kalisz Kaszubski railway station is located in the village, and the Voivodeship road 235 runs through it.
