= Złotowo, Kościerzyna County =

Złotowo
- Settlement
- Location within Poland
- Coordinates: 54°9′52″N 17°52′9″E
- Country: Poland
- Voivodeship: Pomeranian
- County: Kościerzyna
- Gmina: Kościerzyna

Złotowo [zwɔˈtɔvɔ] is a settlement in the administrative district of Gmina Kościerzyna, within Kościerzyna County, Pomeranian Voivodeship, in northern Poland.

For details of the history of the region, see History of Pomerania.
