= Dębina, Kościerzyna County =

Dębina
- Settlement
- Location within Poland
- Coordinates: 53°59′46″N 17°48′28″E
- Country: Poland
- Voivodeship: Pomeranian
- County: Kościerzyna
- Gmina: Dziemiany

Dębina [dɛmˈbina] is a settlement in the administrative district of Gmina Dziemiany, within Kościerzyna County, Pomeranian Voivodeship, in northern Poland.

For details of the history of the region, see History of Pomerania.
