= Czarne, Kościerzyna County =

Czarne
- Settlement
- Location within Poland
- Coordinates: 53°58′54″N 17°48′58″E
- Country: Poland
- Voivodeship: Pomeranian
- County: Kościerzyna
- Gmina: Dziemiany

Czarne [ˈt͡ʂarnɛ] is a settlement in the administrative district of Gmina Dziemiany, within Kościerzyna County, Pomeranian Voivodeship, in northern Poland.

For details of the history of the region, see History of Pomerania.
