= Wdzydze Kiszewskie =

Village in Kashubia

- Village
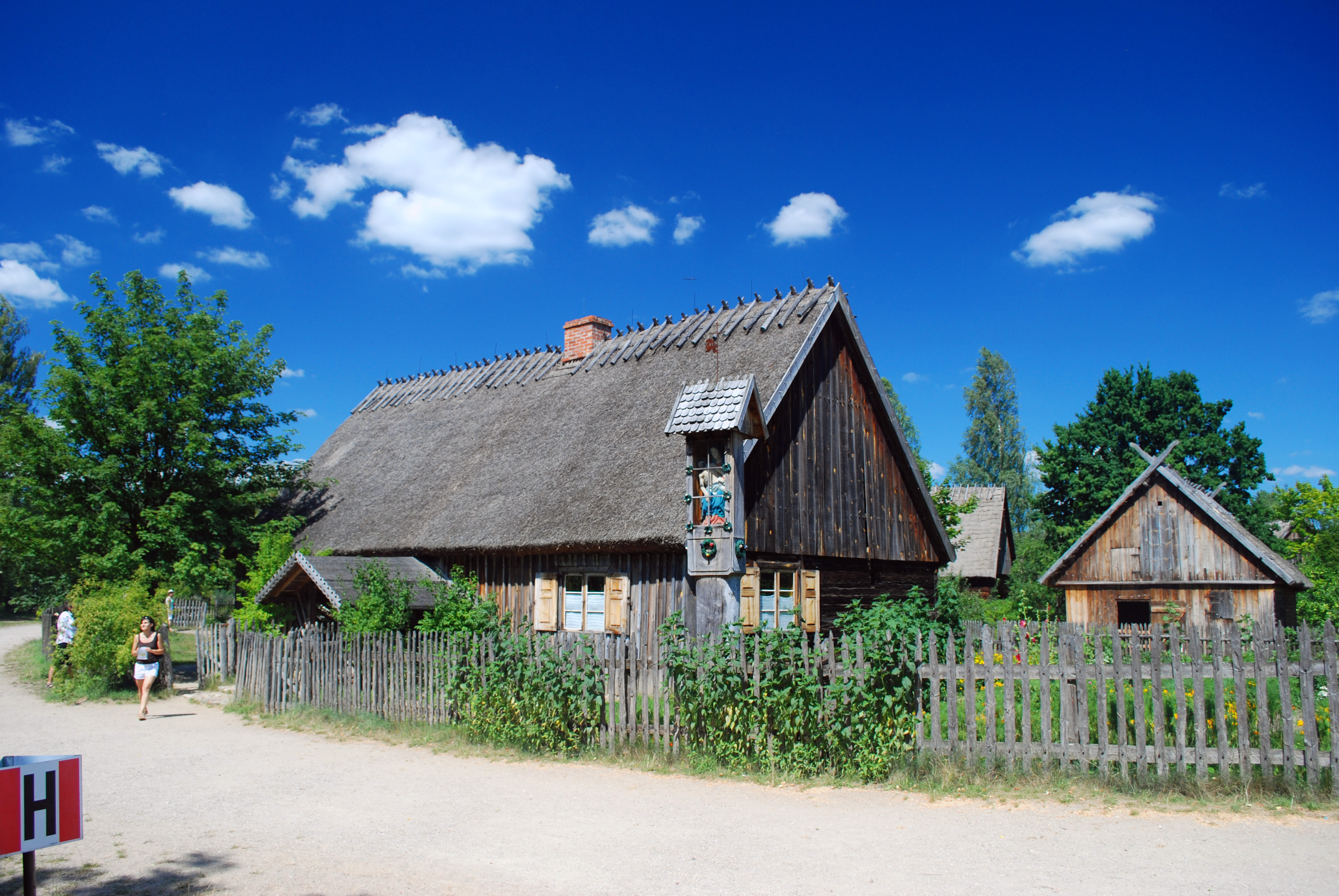
- Traditional Kashubian houses in the Kashubian Ethnographic Park

- Location within Poland
- Coordinates: 54°0′45″N 17°55′52″E
- Country: Poland
- Voivodeship: Pomeranian
- County: Kościerzyna
- Gmina: Kościerzyna
- Elevation: 140 m (460 ft)
- Population: 188
- Time zone: UTC+1 (CET)
  - Summer (DST): UTC+2 (CEST)
- Vehicle registration: GKS

Wdzydze Kiszewskie [ˈvd͡zɨd͡zɛ kiˈʂɛfskʲɛ] is a village in the administrative district of Gmina Kościerzyna, within Kościerzyna County, Pomeranian Voivodeship, in northern Poland. It is located in the ethnocultural region of Kashubia in the historic region of Pomerania.

== Kashubian Ethnographic Park ==
Wdzydze Kiszewskie is famous for its open-air museum, which is the oldest one in Poland. The Kashubian Ethnographic Park (Polish: Kaszubski Park Etnograficzny) is based on an old village of Kashubian fishermen. It was founded in 1906 by Teodora and Izydor Gulgowski. The museum an area of 22ha, located on the banks of the Gołuń lake built up with objects of regional architecture. A totel of 49 objects including; cottages, manors, a school, smithy, windmills, churches, farm buildings and craftsmen's workshops. The museum shows the traditional culture of the Kashubians in several wooden houses.
