= Trzebuń, Pomeranian Voivodeship =

Trzebuń
- Village
- Location within Poland
- Coordinates: 54°0′41″N 17°42′22″E
- Country: Poland
- Voivodeship: Pomeranian
- County: Kościerzyna
- Gmina: Dziemiany

Trzebuń [ˈtʂɛbuɲ] is a village in the administrative district of Gmina Dziemiany, within Kościerzyna County, Pomeranian Voivodeship, in northern Poland.

For details of the history of the region, see History of Pomerania.
