= Niedamowo =

- Village
- Location within Poland
- Coordinates: 54°3′44″N 18°5′36″E
- Country: Poland
- Voivodeship: Pomeranian
- County: Kościerzyna
- Gmina: Kościerzyna
- Elevation: 135 m (443 ft)
- Population: 420

Niedamowo [ɲɛdaˈmɔvɔ] is a village in the administrative district of Gmina Kościerzyna, within Kościerzyna County, Pomeranian Voivodeship, in northern Poland.

For details of the history of the region, see History of Pomerania.
