= Piechowice, Pomeranian Voivodeship =

Piechowice
- Village
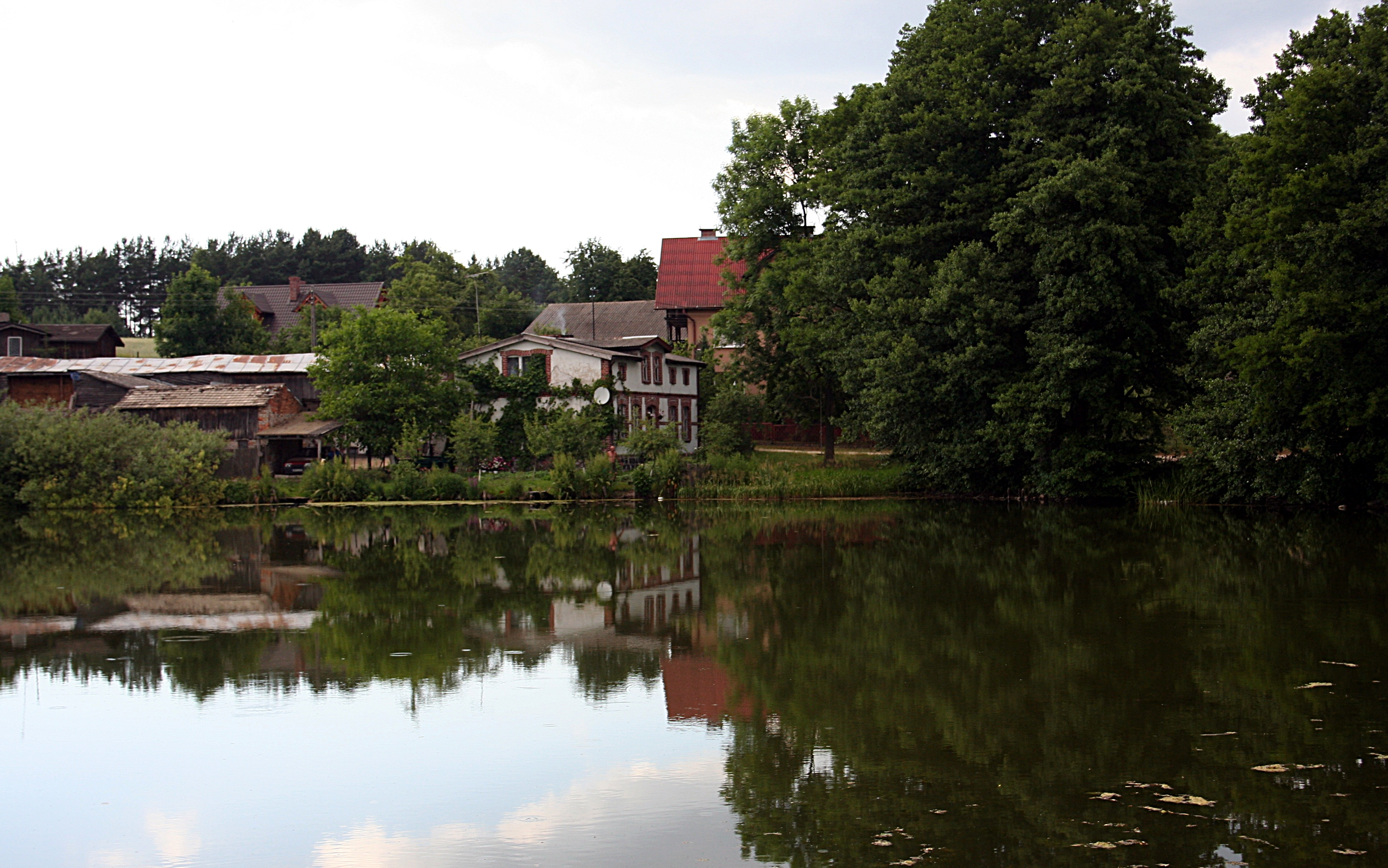

- Location within Poland
- Coordinates: 54°0′59″N 17°48′37″E
- Country: Poland
- Voivodeship: Pomeranian
- County: Kościerzyna
- Gmina: Dziemiany

Population
  - Total: 406
- Time zone: UTC+1 (CET)
  - Summer (DST): UTC+2 (CEST)
- Vehicle registration: GKS

Piechowice [pjɛxɔˈvit͡sɛ] is a village in the administrative district of Gmina Dziemiany, within Kościerzyna County, Pomeranian Voivodeship, in northern Poland. It is located in the ethnocultural region of Kashubia in the historic region of Pomerania.
