= Małe Stawiska =

- Village
- Location within Poland
- Coordinates: 54°2′51″N 18°2′1″E
- Country: Poland
- Voivodeship: Pomeranian
- County: Kościerzyna
- Gmina: Kościerzyna
- Population: 56

Małe Stawiska [ˈmawɛ staˈviska] is a village in the administrative district of Gmina Kościerzyna, within Kościerzyna County, Pomeranian Voivodeship, in northern Poland.

For details of the history of the region, see History of Pomerania.
