= Skorzewo =

- Village
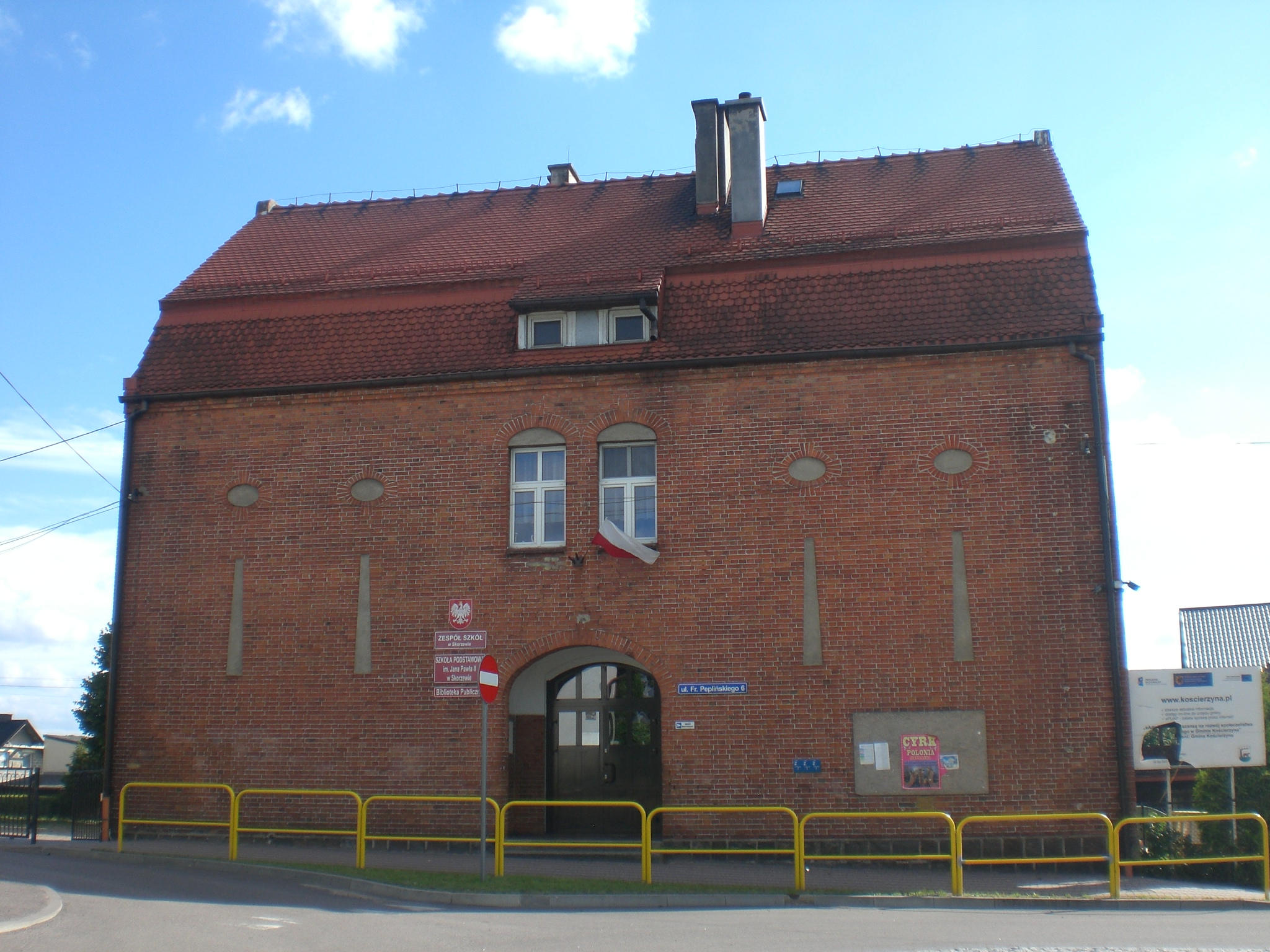
- Primary school in Skorzewo

- Location within Poland
- Coordinates: 54°10′5″N 17°58′13″E
- Country: Poland
- Voivodeship: Pomeranian
- County: Kościerzyna
- Gmina: Kościerzyna
- Population: 1,323
- Time zone: UTC+1 (CET)
  - Summer (DST): UTC+2 (CEST)

Skorzewo [skɔˈʐɛvɔ] is a village in the administrative district of Gmina Kościerzyna, within Kościerzyna County, Pomeranian Voivodeship, in northern Poland. It is located within the ethnocultural region of Kashubia in the historic region of Pomerania.

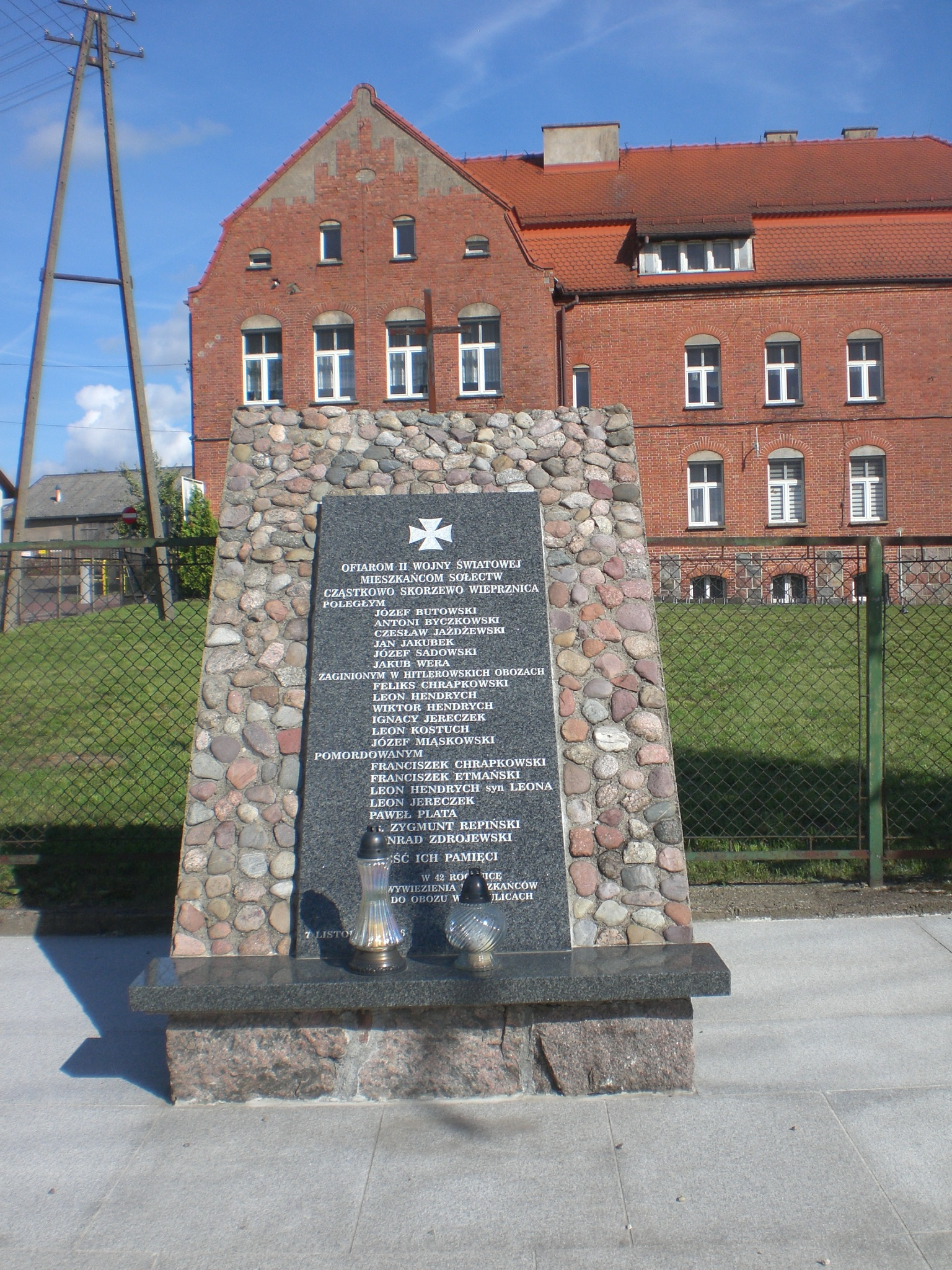
Memorial to the local victims of World War II

Skorzewo was a royal village of the Polish Crown, administratively located in the Tczew County in the Pomeranian Voivodeship.
