= Będominek =

Będominek Bãdomink
- Village
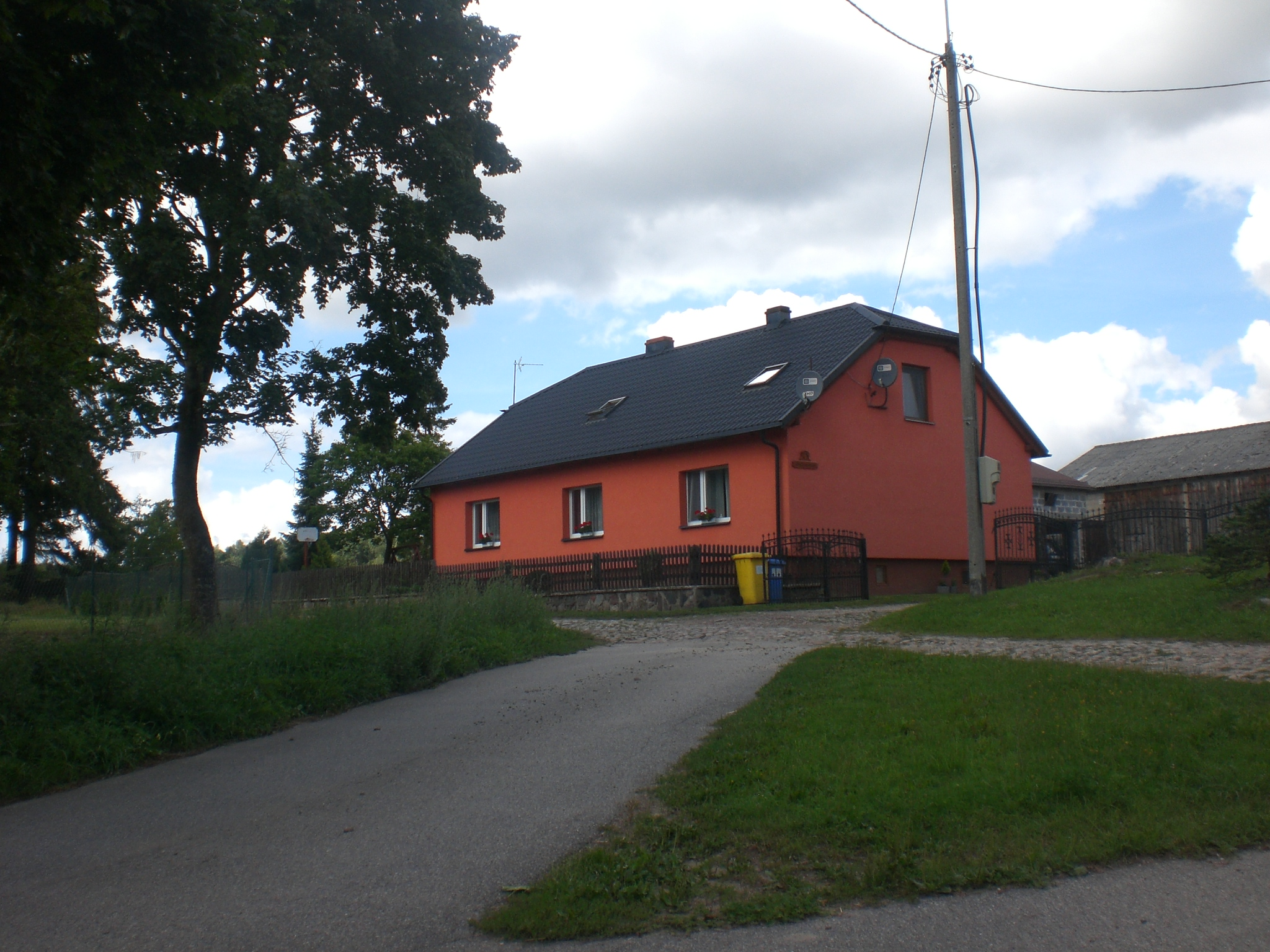

- Location within Poland
- Coordinates: 54°7′53″N 18°6′19″E
- Country: Poland
- Voivodeship: Pomeranian
- County: Kościerzyna
- Gmina: Kościerzyna

Population
  - Total: 60
- Time zone: UTC+1 (CET)
  - Summer (DST): UTC+2 (CEST)
- Postal code: 83-422
- Vehicle registration: GKS

Będominek [bɛndɔˈminɛk] (Kashubian: Bãdomink) is a village in the administrative district of Gmina Kościerzyna, located within Kościerzyna County, Pomeranian Voivodeship, in northern Poland. It is located in the ethnocultural region of Kashubia in the historic region of Pomerania.
