= Zimny Dwór =

- Settlement
- Location within Poland
- Coordinates: 54°1′28″N 17°42′31″E
- Country: Poland
- Voivodeship: Pomeranian
- County: Kościerzyna
- Gmina: Dziemiany

Zimny Dwór [ˈʑimnɨ ˈdvur], Cold Court in English) is a settlement in the administrative district of Gmina Dziemiany, within Kościerzyna County, Pomeranian Voivodeship, in northern Poland.

For details of the history of the region, see History of Pomerania.
