= Tomaszewo, Kościerzyna County =

Tomaszewo
- Village
- Location within Poland
- Coordinates: 54°1′25″N 17°48′40″E
- Country: Poland
- Voivodeship: Pomeranian
- County: Kościerzyna
- Gmina: Dziemiany

Tomaszewo [tɔmaˈʂɛvɔ] is a village in the administrative district of Gmina Dziemiany, within Kościerzyna County, Pomeranian Voivodeship, in northern Poland.

For details of the history of the region, see History of Pomerania.
