= Grzybowski Młyn =

- Settlement
- Location within Poland
- Coordinates: 54°3′58″N 17°53′47″E
- Country: Poland
- Voivodeship: Pomeranian
- County: Kościerzyna
- Gmina: Kościerzyna
- Population: 50

Grzybowski Młyn [ɡʐɨˈbɔfski ˈmwɨn] is a settlement in the administrative district of Gmina Kościerzyna, within Kościerzyna County, Pomeranian Voivodeship, in northern Poland.

For details of the history of the region, see History of Pomerania.
