= Dobrogoszcz, Pomeranian Voivodeship =

Dobrogoszcz Dobrogòszcz
- Village

- Location within Poland
- Coordinates: 54°8′46″N 18°2′47″E
- Country: Poland
- Voivodeship: Pomeranian
- County: Kościerzyna
- Gmina: Kościerzyna
- Population: 168

Dobrogoszcz [dɔˈbrɔɡɔʂt͡ʂ] (Kashubian: Dobrogòszcz) is a village in the administrative district of Gmina Kościerzyna, within Kościerzyna County, Pomeranian Voivodeship, in northern Poland.

For details of the history of the region, see History of Pomerania.
