= Plon (disambiguation) =

Plon may refer to:

- Plön, the district seat of the Plön district in Schleswig-Holstein, Germany
- Plon, Pomeranian Voivodeship, a village in Poland
- Plon (publisher), a French book publishing company
- Plon (sculpture), a sculpture in Poland
