= Puc =

Puc may refer to:

- Puc, Poland, a village in Kościerzyna County, Pomeranian Voivodeship
- Puc, Kostel, settlement in Slovenia
- Antonín Puč (1907–1988), Czech footballer
- Blaž Puc (born 1978), Slovenian footballer
- Borut Puc (born 1991), Croatian–Slovenian tennis player
- Iztok Puc (1966–2011), Croatian–Slovenian handball player
- Sandy Puc' (born 1969), American photographer
- Stojan Puc (1921–2004), Slovenian–Yugoslavian chess player

== See also ==
- PUC (disambiguation)
- Puck (disambiguation)
