= Nowa Kiszewa =

- Village
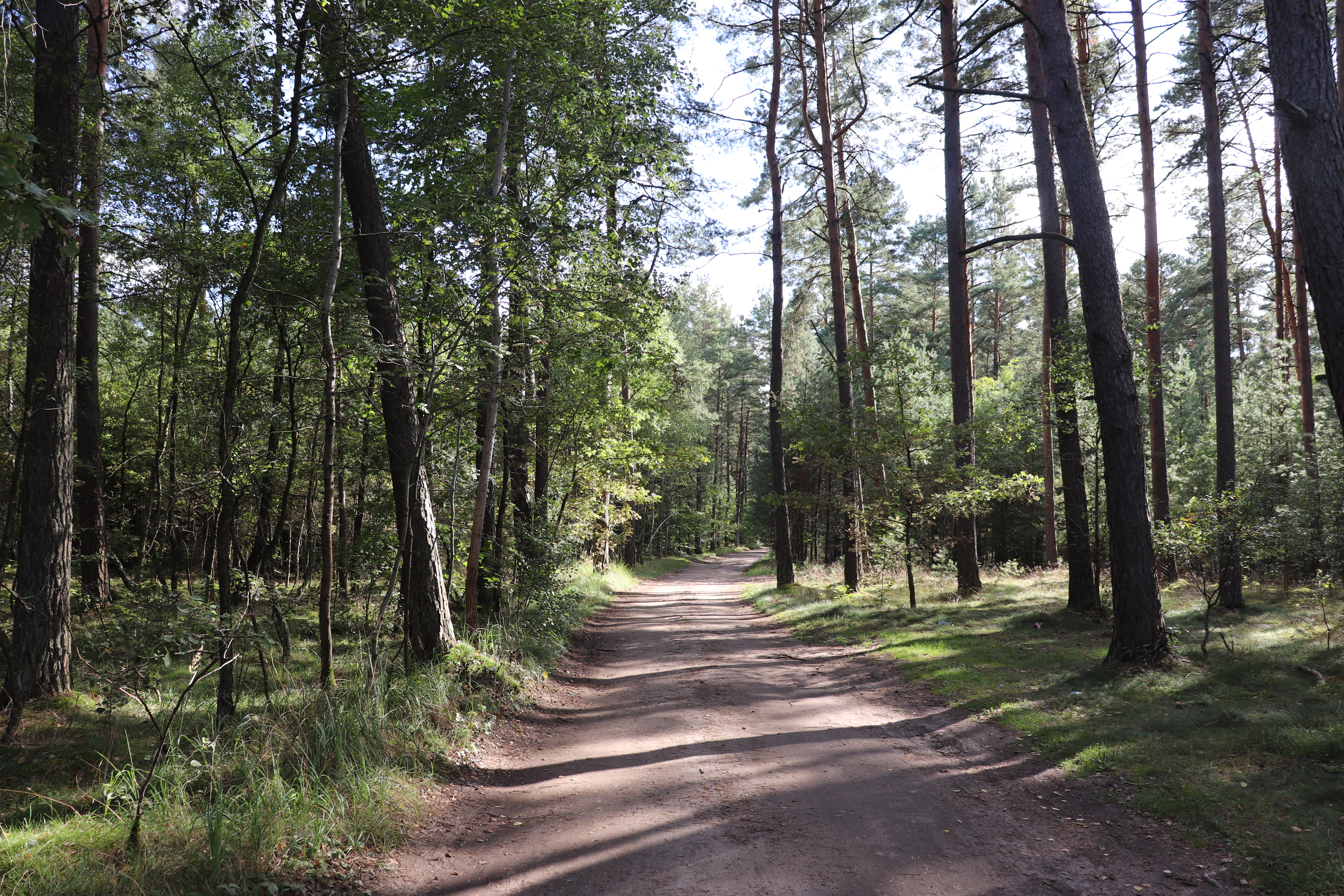

- Location within Poland
- Coordinates: 54°2′8″N 18°2′31″E
- Country: Poland
- Voivodeship: Pomeranian
- County: Kościerzyna
- Gmina: Kościerzyna
- Elevation: 136.6 m (448 ft)

Population
  - Total: 187

Nowa Kiszewa [ˈnɔva kiˈʂɛva] is a village in the administrative district of Gmina Kościerzyna, within Kościerzyna County, Pomeranian Voivodeship, in northern Poland. It is located in the ethnocultural region of Kashubia in the historic region of Pomerania.

Seven Polish citizens were murdered by Nazi Germany in the village during World War II.
