= Dąbrówka, Gmina Dziemiany =

Dąbrówka
- Village
- Location within Poland
- Coordinates: 54°1′19″N 17°49′57″E
- Country: Poland
- Voivodeship: Pomeranian
- County: Kościerzyna
- Gmina: Dziemiany

Dąbrówka [dɔmˈbrufka] is a village in the administrative district of Gmina Dziemiany, within Kościerzyna County, Pomeranian Voivodeship, in northern Poland.

For details of the history of the region, see History of Pomerania.
