= Skoczkowo, Pomeranian Voivodeship =

Skoczkowo
- Settlement
- Location within Poland
- Coordinates: 54°2′4″N 17°56′7″E
- Country: Poland
- Voivodeship: Pomeranian
- County: Kościerzyna
- Gmina: Kościerzyna

Skoczkowo [skɔt͡ʂˈkɔvɔ] is a settlement in the administrative district of Gmina Kościerzyna, within Kościerzyna County, Pomeranian Voivodeship, in northern Poland.

For details of the history of the region, see History of Pomerania.
