= Częstkowo, Kościerzyna County =

Częstkowo Czãstkòwò
- Village
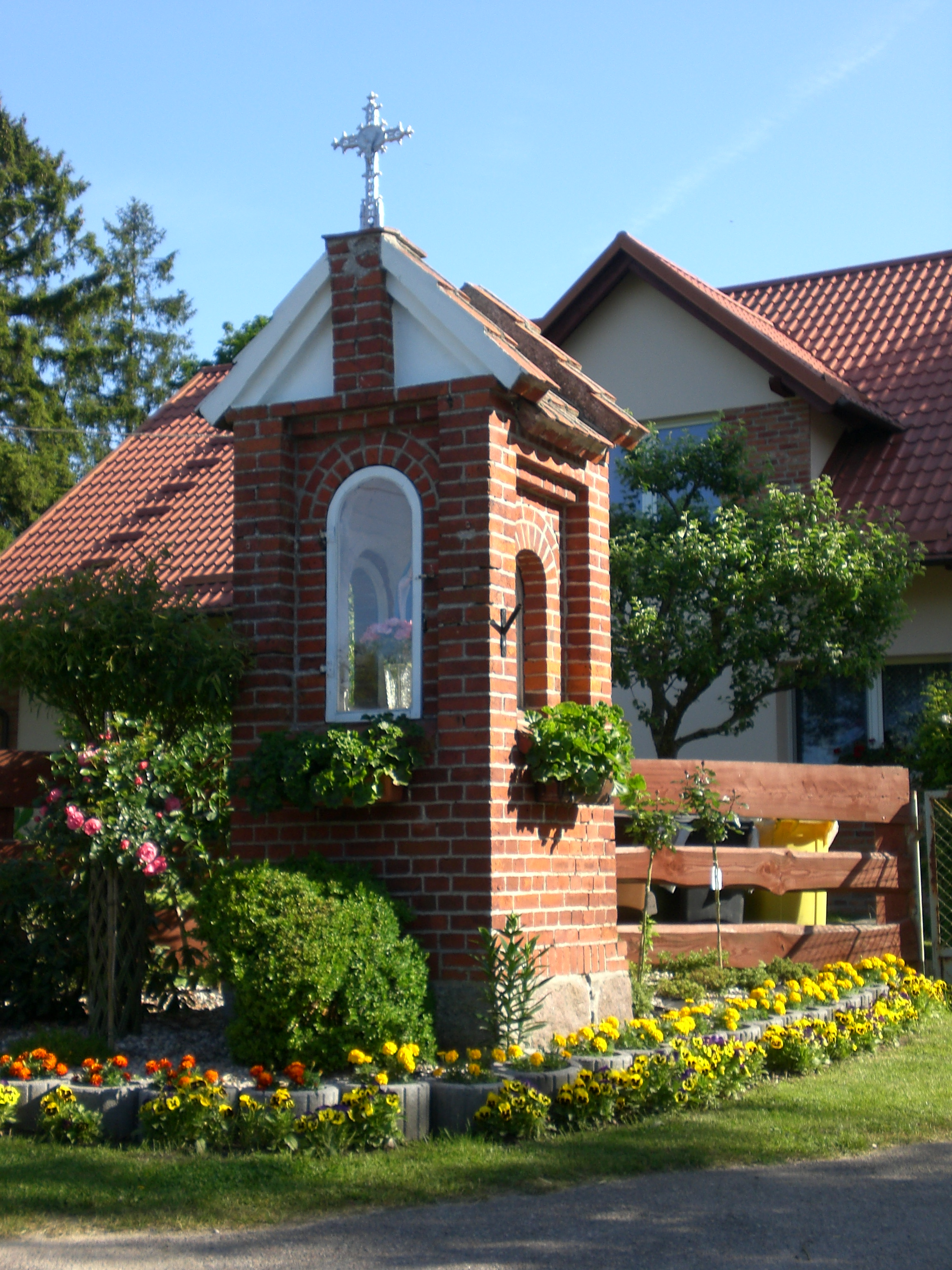
- Częstkowo, kapliczka

- Location within Poland
- Coordinates: 54°10′3″N 17°55′53″E
- Country: Poland
- Voivodeship: Pomeranian
- County: Kościerzyna
- Gmina: Kościerzyna
- Population: 72

Częstkowo [t͡ʂɛ̃stˈkɔvɔ] (Kashubian: Czãstkòwò) is a village in the administrative district of Gmina Kościerzyna, within Kościerzyna County, Pomeranian Voivodeship, in northern Poland.

For details of the history of the region, see History of Pomerania.
