= Łubiana =

- Village
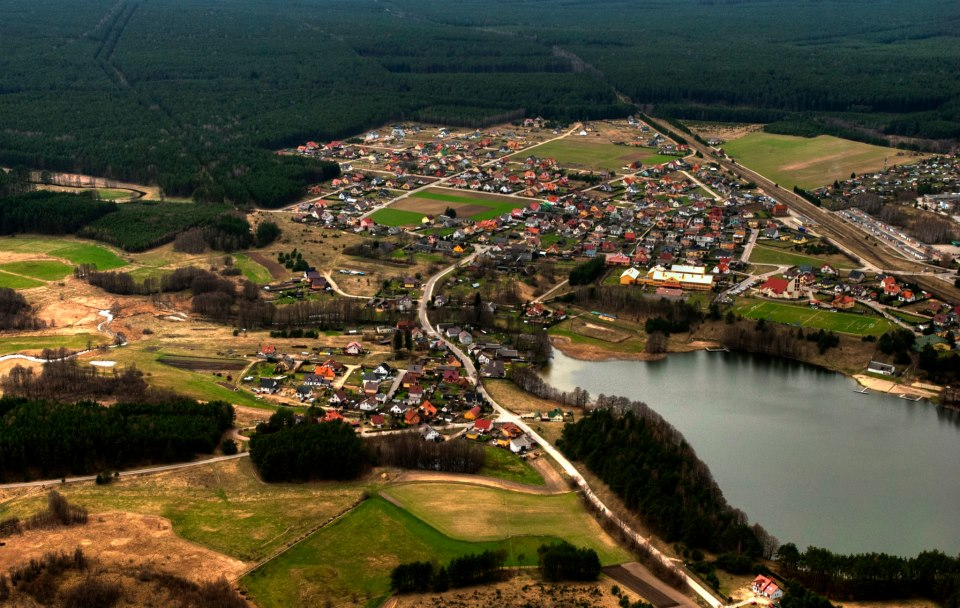
- Aerial view of Łubiana

- Location within Poland
- Coordinates: 54°6′N 17°52′E
- Country: Poland
- Voivodeship: Pomeranian
- County: Kościerzyna
- Gmina: Kościerzyna
- Elevation: 145 m (476 ft)

Population (approx.)
  - Total: 2,500
- Time zone: UTC+1 (CET)
  - Summer (DST): UTC+2 (CEST)
- Vehicle registration: GKS

Łubiana [wuˈbjana] is a village in the administrative district of Gmina Kościerzyna, within Kościerzyna County, Pomeranian Voivodeship, in northern Poland. It is situated on the western shore of Lake Graniczne, within the ethnocultural region of Kashubia in the historic region of Pomerania.

The Catholic church of Saint Maximilian Kolbe is located in Łubiana.

== History ==
Łubiana was a royal village of the Polish Crown, administratively located in the Tczew County in the Pomeranian Voivodeship.

During the German occupation of Poland (World War II), Łubiana was one of the sites of executions of Poles, carried out by the Germans in 1939 as part of the Intelligenzaktion. On 26 May 1944, one of the largest battles between Polish partisans and the Germans in Pomerania was fought near Łubiana. Some 50 partisans of the Pomeranian Griffin Polish resistance movement were encircled by 300 Germans. 15 partisans were killed, but the rest managed to break the encirclement.

In 1969 a porcelain factory was established in Łubiana.

== Sports ==
The local football club is Ceramik Łubiana. It competes in the lower leagues.

== Transport ==
There is a train station in the village.
