= Kalwaria, Pomeranian Voivodeship =

Kalwaria
- Village
- Location within Poland
- Coordinates: 53°58′22″N 17°45′55″E
- Country: Poland
- Voivodeship: Pomeranian
- County: Kościerzyna
- Gmina: Dziemiany

Kalwaria (Polish: [kalˈvarja]) is a village in the administrative district of Gmina Dziemiany, within Kościerzyna County, Pomeranian Voivodeship, in northern Poland.

For details of the history of the region, see History of Pomerania.
