= Nowa Wieś Kościerska =

Nowa Wieś Kościerska Nowô Wies
- Village

- Location within Poland
- Coordinates: 54°9′16″N 18°0′23″E
- Country: Poland
- Voivodeship: Pomeranian
- County: Kościerzyna
- Gmina: Kościerzyna
- Population: 360

Nowa Wieś Kościerska [ˈnɔva ˈvjɛɕ kɔɕˈt͡ɕɛrska] (Kashubian: Nowô Wies) is a village in the administrative district of Gmina Kościerzyna, within Kościerzyna County, Pomeranian Voivodeship, in northern Poland.

For details of the history of the region, see History of Pomerania.
