= Garczyn =

Garczyn may refer to:

- Garczyn, Gmina Liniewo (Pomeranian Voivodeship, Poland)
- Garczyn, Gmina Kościerzyna (Pomeranian Voivodeship, Poland)
