= Gołuń, Pomeranian Voivodeship =

Gołuń
- Village
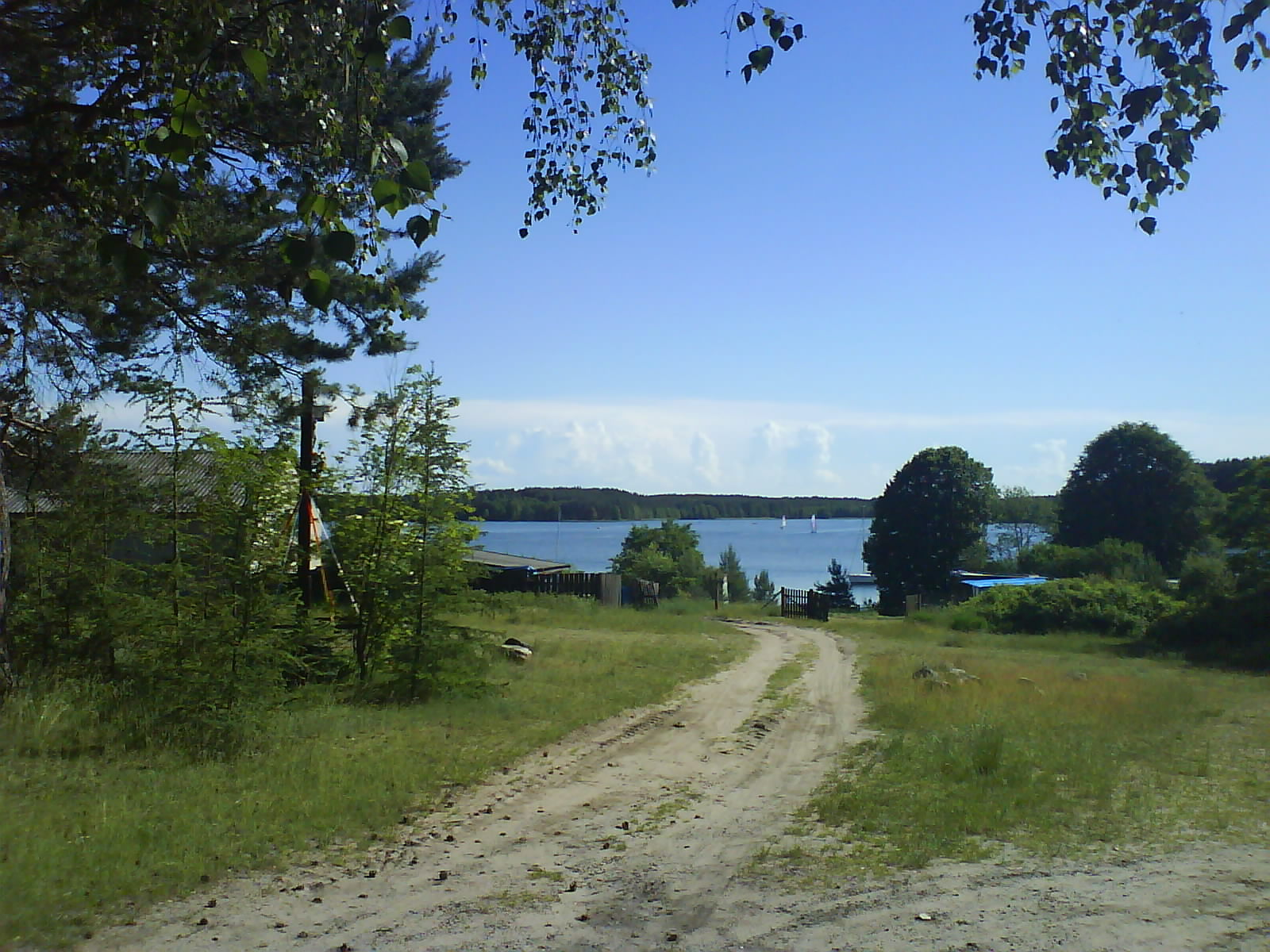

- Location within Poland
- Coordinates: 54°0′52″N 17°59′32″E
- Country: Poland
- Voivodeship: Pomeranian
- County: Kościerzyna
- Gmina: Kościerzyna
- Population: 62

Gołuń [ˈɡɔwuɲ] is a village in the administrative district of Gmina Kościerzyna, within Kościerzyna County, Pomeranian Voivodeship, in northern Poland.

For details of the history of the region, see History of Pomerania.
