= Sycowa Huta =

- Village
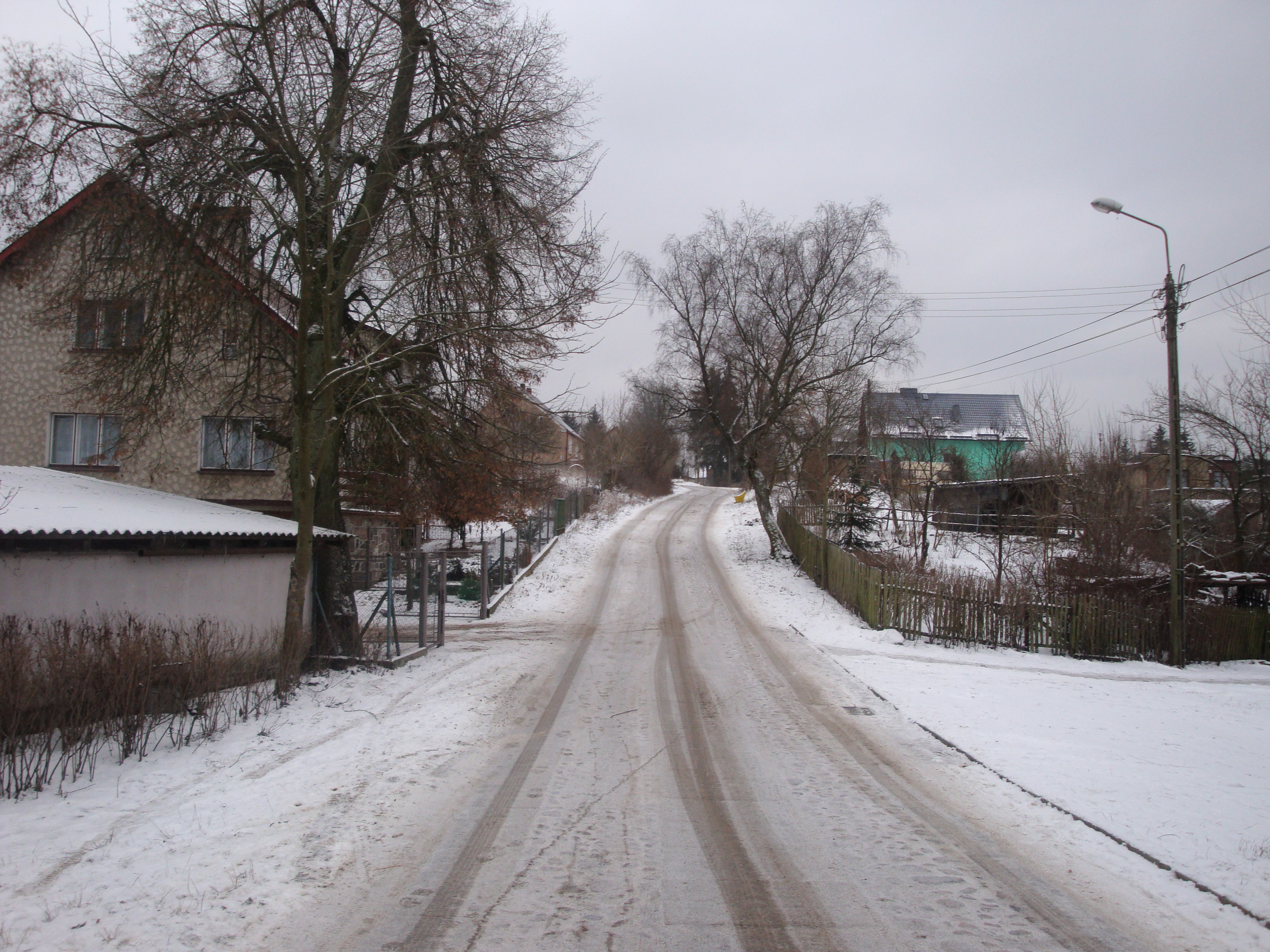

- Location within Poland
- Coordinates: 54°5′20″N 17°54′38″E
- Country: Poland
- Voivodeship: Pomeranian
- County: Kościerzyna
- Gmina: Kościerzyna
- Population: 62

Sycowa Huta [sɨˈt͡sɔva ˈxuta] is a village in the administrative district of Gmina Kościerzyna, within Kościerzyna County, Pomeranian Voivodeship, in northern Poland.

== See also ==
- History of Pomerania
