= Loryniec =

- Village
- Location within Poland
- Coordinates: 54°2′45″N 17°53′47″E
- Country: Poland
- Voivodeship: Pomeranian
- County: Kościerzyna
- Gmina: Kościerzyna
- Population: 172
- Website: http://www.loryniec.koscierzyna.pl

Loryniec [lɔˈrɨɲɛt͡s] is a village in the administrative district of Gmina Kościerzyna, within Kościerzyna County, Pomeranian Voivodeship, in northern Poland.

For details of the history of the region, see History of Pomerania.
