= Rów =

Rów may refer to the following places:

- Rów, Pomeranian Voivodeship (north Poland)
- Rów, Warmian-Masurian Voivodeship (north Poland)
- Rów, West Pomeranian Voivodeship (north-west Poland)
- Rów (peninsula), in Szczecin Lagoon
