= Przerębska Huta, Kościerzyna County =

Settlement in Kashubia

Przerębska Huta Przerãbskô Hëta
- Settlement
- Location within Poland
- Coordinates: 54°1′6″N 17°53′32″E
- Country: Poland
- Voivodeship: Pomeranian
- County: Kościerzyna
- Gmina: Dziemiany

Przerębska Huta [pʂɛˈrɛmpska ˈxuta] (Kashubian: Przerãbskô Hëta) is a settlement in the administrative district of Gmina Dziemiany, within Kościerzyna County, Pomeranian Voivodeship, in northern Poland.

For details of the history of the region, see History of Pomerania.
