= Dębrzyno =

Dębrzyno Debrzno
- Hamlet
- Location within Poland
- Coordinates: 54°3′30″N 17°58′30″E
- Country: Poland
- Voivodeship: Pomeranian
- County: Kościerzyna
- Gmina: Kościerzyna

Dębrzyno [dɛmˈbʐɨnɔ] (Kashubian: Debrzno) is a hamlet in the administrative district of Gmina Kościerzyna, within Kościerzyna County, Pomeranian Voivodeship, in northern Poland.

For details of the history of the region, see History of Pomerania.
