= Zajączkowo, Kościerzyna County =

Zajączkowo
- Settlement
- Location within Poland
- Coordinates: 54°1′1″N 17°40′30″E
- Country: Poland
- Voivodeship: Pomeranian
- County: Kościerzyna
- Gmina: Dziemiany
- Population: 8

Zajączkowo [zajɔnt͡ʂˈkɔvɔ] is a settlement in the administrative district of Gmina Dziemiany, within Kościerzyna County, Pomeranian Voivodeship, in northern Poland.

For details of the history of the region, see History of Pomerania.
