= Kruszyna, Kościerzyna County =

Kruszyna
- Settlement
- Location within Poland
- Coordinates: 54°0′8″N 17°58′31″E
- Country: Poland
- Voivodeship: Pomeranian
- County: Kościerzyna
- Gmina: Kościerzyna
- Time zone: UTC+1 (CET)
  - Summer (DST): UTC+2 (CEST)

Kruszyna [kruˈʂɨna] is a settlement in the administrative district of Gmina Kościerzyna, within Kościerzyna County, Pomeranian Voivodeship, in northern Poland. It is located in the ethnocultural region of Kashubia in the historic region of Pomerania.
