= Szenajda =

Szenajda Szénajda
- Village

- Location within Poland
- Coordinates: 54°2′17″N 18°0′24″E
- Country: Poland
- Voivodeship: Pomeranian
- County: Kościerzyna
- Gmina: Kościerzyna

Szenajda [ʂɛˈnai̯da] (Kashubian: Szénajda) is a village in the administrative district of Gmina Kościerzyna, within Kościerzyna County, Pomeranian Voivodeship, in northern Poland.

For details of the history of the region, see History of Pomerania.
