= Gostomie =

- Village
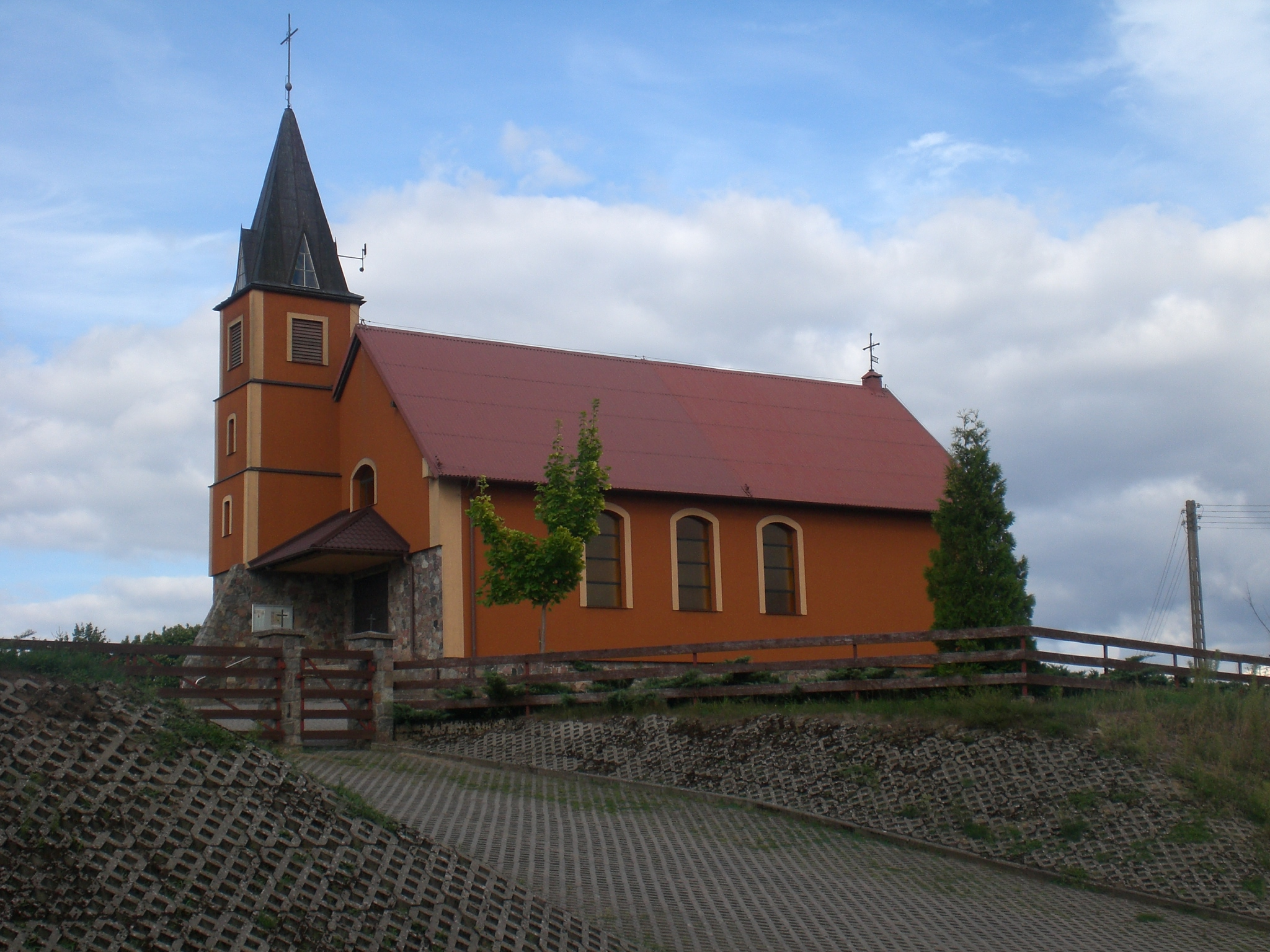
- Exaltation of the Holy Cross church in Gostomie

- Location within Poland
- Coordinates: 54°10′55″N 17°52′17″E
- Country: Poland
- Voivodeship: Pomeranian
- County: Kościerzyna
- Gmina: Kościerzyna
- Population: 191
- Time zone: UTC+1 (CET)
  - Summer (DST): UTC+2 (CEST)
- Vehicle registration: GKS

Gostomie [ɡɔsˈtɔmjɛ] is a village in the administrative district of Gmina Kościerzyna, within Kościerzyna County, Pomeranian Voivodeship, in northern Poland. It is located in the ethnocultural region of Kashubia in the historic region of Pomerania.

== History ==
During the German occupation of Poland (World War II), Gostomie was one of the sites of executions of Poles, carried out by the Germans in 1939 as part of the Intelligenzaktion.
