= Płęsy =

- Village
- Location within Poland
- Coordinates: 54°0′31″N 17°53′41″E
- Country: Poland
- Voivodeship: Pomeranian
- County: Kościerzyna
- Gmina: Dziemiany
- Population: 8

Płęsy [ˈpwɛ̃sɨ] is a village in the administrative district of Gmina Dziemiany, within Kościerzyna County, Pomeranian Voivodeship, in northern Poland.

For details of the history of the region, see History of Pomerania.
