= Presidential Unit Citation =

A Presidential Unit Citation is a unit citation awarded by the president of a state.

Specific awards include:

- Presidential Unit Citation (United States), awarded for actions on or after December 7, 1941, World War II
- Presidential Unit Citation (South Korea), awarded to South Korean military and foreign military for defense of the Republic of Korea
- Philippine Republic Presidential Unit Citation, awarded to U.S. military and Philippine military for actions during and after World War II
- Vietnam Presidential Unit Citation, August 15, 1950, considered obsolete since South Vietnam no longer exists

== See also ==
- PUC (disambiguation)
