= Mały Podleś =

- Village
- Location within Poland
- Coordinates: 54°4′55″N 18°1′35″E
- Country: Poland
- Voivodeship: Pomeranian
- County: Kościerzyna
- Gmina: Kościerzyna
- Population: 135

Mały Podleś (Polish pronunciation: [ˈmawɨ ˈpɔdlɛɕ]) is a village in the administrative district of Gmina Kościerzyna, within Kościerzyna County, Pomeranian Voivodeship, in northern Poland.

For details of the history of the region, see History of Pomerania.
