= Kloc (disambiguation) =

Kloc or KLOC may refer to:

== People ==
- Hy Kloc (1947-2022), American politician
- Izabela Kloc (born 1963), Polish politician

== Broadcast stations ==
=== United States ===
- KLOC, a radio station in Turlock, California, broadcasting a Regional Mexican format
- KUVS-DT, formerly KLOC-TV, a television station serving Sacramento, California

== Other uses ==
- Kloc, Pomeranian Voivodeship, in northern Poland
- kLOC, for "thousands of source lines of code", a software development metric
- Kingpin: Life of Crime, a video game
