= Gmina Dziemiany =

Gmina Dziemiany Dziemiany Commune
- Gmina
- Flag Coat of arms
- Interactive map of Gmina Dziemiany
- Coordinates (Dziemiany): 54°0′23″N 17°46′6″E
- Country: Poland
- Voivodeship: Pomeranian
- County: Kościerzyna
- Seat: Dziemiany

Area
  - Total: 124.97 km^{2} (48.25 sq mi)

Population (2006)
  - Total: 4,065
  - Density: 32.53/km^{2} (84.25/sq mi)
- Website: http://dziemiany.pl/

Gmina Dziemiany (Kashubian: Dzemiónë) is a rural gmina (administrative district) in Kościerzyna County, Pomeranian Voivodeship, in northern Poland. Its seat is the village of Dziemiany, which lies approximately 19 kilometres (12 mi) south-west of Kościerzyna and 70 km (43 mi) south-west of the regional capital Gdańsk.

The gmina covers an area of 124.97 square kilometres (48.3 sq mi), and as of 2006 its total population is 4,065.

The gmina contains part of the protected area called Wdydze Landscape Park.

== Villages ==
Gmina Dziemiany contains the villages and settlements of Belfort, Białe Błoto, Borsztal, Czarne, Dąbrówka, Dębina, Dunajki, Dywan, Dziemiany, Głuchy Bór, Jastrzębie Dziemiańskie, Kalisz, Kalwaria, Kloc, Lampkowo, Leżuchowo, Milkowo, Mutkowo, Nowe Słone, Pełki, Piechowice, Płęsy, Przerębska Huta, Raduń, Rów, Rozwalewo, Schodno, Słupinko, Stare Słone, Szablewo, Tklania, Tomaszewo, Trzebuń, Turzonka, Wilczewo, Żabowo, Zajączkowo, Zarośle, Zatrzebionka and Zimny Dwór.

== Neighbouring gminas ==
Gmina Dziemiany is bordered by the gminas of Brusy, Karsin, Kościerzyna, Lipusz and Studzienice.
