= Gościeradz, Kościerzyna County =

Gościeradz Gòscerôdz (Kashubian)
- Settlement
- Location within Poland
- Coordinates: 54°6′7″N 18°1′8″E
- Country: Poland
- Voivodeship: Pomeranian
- County: Kościerzyna
- Gmina: Kościerzyna

Gościeradz (Polish: [ɡɔɕˈt͡ɕɛrat͡s]) is a settlement in the administrative district of Gmina Kościerzyna, within Kościerzyna County, Pomeranian Voivodeship, in northern Poland.

For details of the history of the region, see History of Pomerania.
