= Gmina Kościerzyna =

Gmina Kościerzyna Kościerzyna Commune
- Gmina
- Flag Coat of arms
- Interactive map of Gmina Kościerzyna
- Coordinates (Kościerzyna): 54°7′N 17°59′E
- Country: Poland
- Voivodeship: Pomeranian
- County: Kościerzyna
- Seat: Kościerzyna

Area
  - Total: 310.15 km^{2} (119.75 sq mi)

Population (2006)
  - Total: 13,295
  - Density: 42.866/km^{2} (111.02/sq mi)

Gmina Kościerzyna is a rural gmina (administrative district) in Kościerzyna County, Pomeranian Voivodeship, in northern Poland. Its seat is the town of Kościerzyna, although the town is not part of the territory of the gmina.

The gmina covers an area of 310.15 square kilometres (119.7 sq mi), and as of 2006 its total population is 13,295.

The gmina contains parts of the protected areas called Kashubian Landscape Park and Wdydze Landscape Park.

== Villages ==
Gmina Kościerzyna contains the villages and settlements of Będominek, Czarlina, Czarne Pustkowie, Częstkowo, Dąbrówka, Dębogóry, Debrzyno, Dobrogoszcz, Fingrowa Huta, Garczyn, Gołuń, Gościeradz, Gostomie, Grzybowo, Grzybowski Młyn, Juszki, Kaliska Kościerskie, Kania, Kłobuczyno, Korne, Kościerska Huta, Kościerzyna-Wybudowanie, Kruszyna, Kula Młyn, Lizaki, Loryniec, Łubiana, Ludwikowo, Małe Stawiska, Mały Klincz, Mały Podleś, Niedamowo, Nowa Karczma, Nowa Kiszewa, Nowa Wieś Kościerska, Nowy Klincz, Nowy Podleś, Owśnice, Owśniczka, Piekło, Plon, Puc, Rotembark, Sarnowy, Skoczkowo, Skorzewo, Smolniki, Stawiska, Sycowa Huta, Szenajda, Szludron, Wąglikowice, Wawrzynowo, Wdzydze Kiszewskie, Wętfie, Wielki Klincz, Wielki Podleś, Wieprznica, Wierzysko, Wygoda, Zabrody, Zielenin and Złotowo.

== Neighbouring gminas ==
Gmina Kościerzyna is bordered by the town of Kościerzyna and by the gminas of Dziemiany, Karsin, Liniewo, Lipusz, Nowa Karczma, Somonino, Stara Kiszewa, Stężyca and Sulęczyno.
