= Garczyn, Gmina Kościerzyna =

Garczyn Gôrczëno
- Hamlet
- Location within Poland
- Coordinates: 54°7′38″N 17°54′29″E
- Country: Poland
- Voivodeship: Pomeranian
- County: Kościerzyna
- Gmina: Kościerzyna
- Elevation: 146 m (479 ft)

Garczyn [ˈɡart͡ʂɨn] (Kashubian: Gôrczëno) is a hamlet in the administrative district of Gmina Kościerzyna, within Kościerzyna County, Pomeranian Voivodeship, in northern Poland.

For details of the history of the region, see History of Pomerania.
