= Wilczewo, Kościerzyna County =

Wilczewo
- Settlement
- Location within Poland
- Coordinates: 54°0′3″N 17°42′58″E
- Country: Poland
- Voivodeship: Pomeranian
- County: Kościerzyna
- Gmina: Dziemiany
- Population: 7

Wilczewo [vilˈt͡ʂɛvɔ] is a settlement in the administrative district of Gmina Dziemiany, within Kościerzyna County, Pomeranian Voivodeship, in northern Poland.

For details of the history of the region, see History of Pomerania.
