= Kloc, Pomeranian Voivodeship =

Kloc
- Village
- Location within Poland
- Coordinates: 54°1′1″N 17°50′1″E
- Country: Poland
- Voivodeship: Pomeranian
- County: Kościerzyna
- Gmina: Dziemiany

Kloc [klɔt͡s] is a village in the administrative district of Gmina Dziemiany, within Kościerzyna County, Pomeranian Voivodeship, in northern Poland.

For details of the history of the region, see History of Pomerania.
