= Wielki Podleś =

- Village
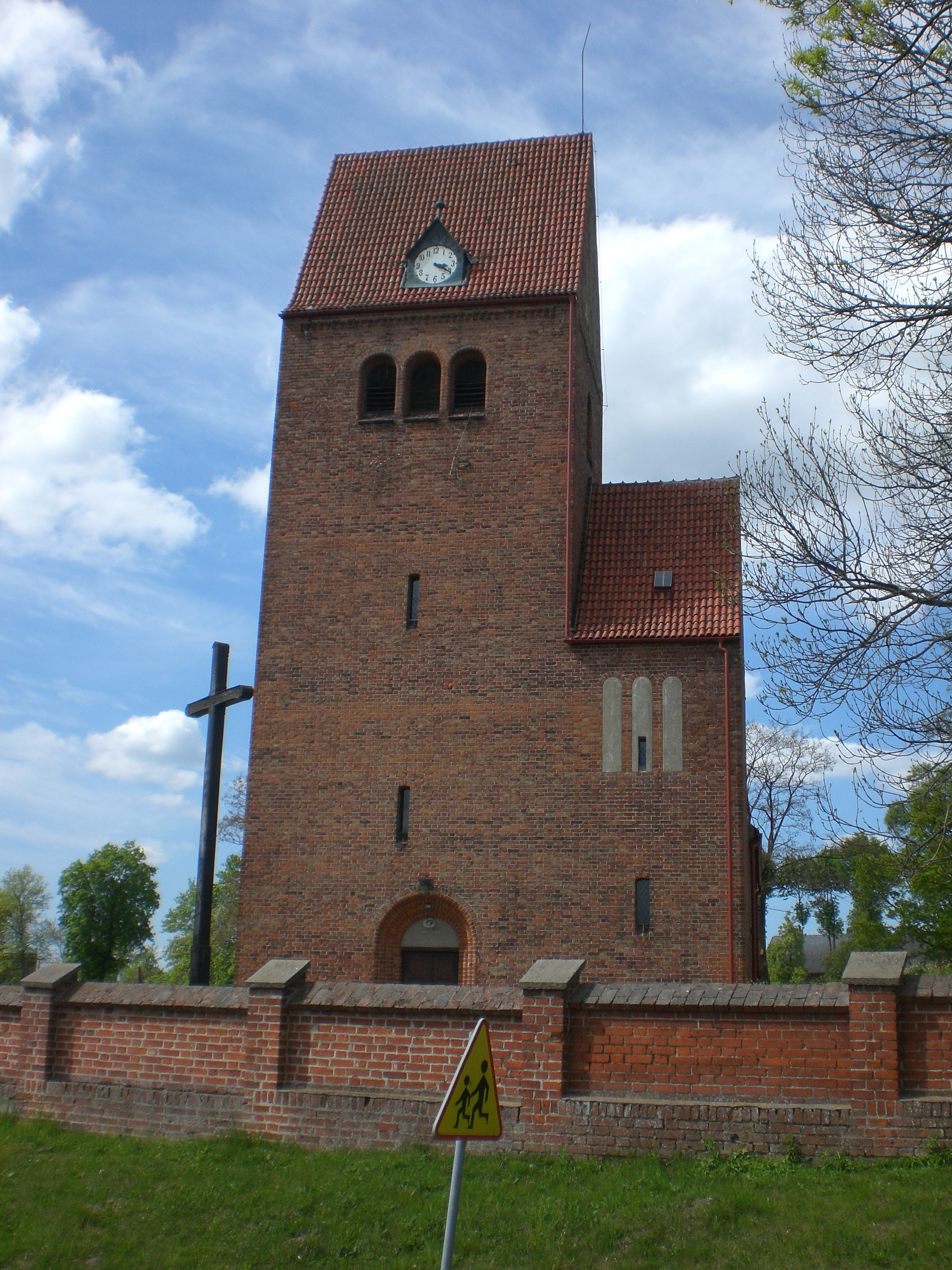
- Church of Saint Andrew Bobola

- Location within Poland
- Coordinates: 54°4′19″N 18°2′7″E
- Country: Poland
- Voivodeship: Pomeranian
- County: Kościerzyna
- Gmina: Kościerzyna

Population
  - Total: 255

Wielki Podleś (Polish pronunciation: [ˈvjɛlkʲi ˈpɔdlɛɕ]) is a village in the administrative district of Gmina Kościerzyna, within Kościerzyna County, Pomeranian Voivodeship, in northern Poland.

For details of the history of the region, see History of Pomerania.
