= Podleś railway station =

Railway station in Nowy Podleś, Poland

Coordinates: 54°04′39″N 18°00′14″E

Podleś
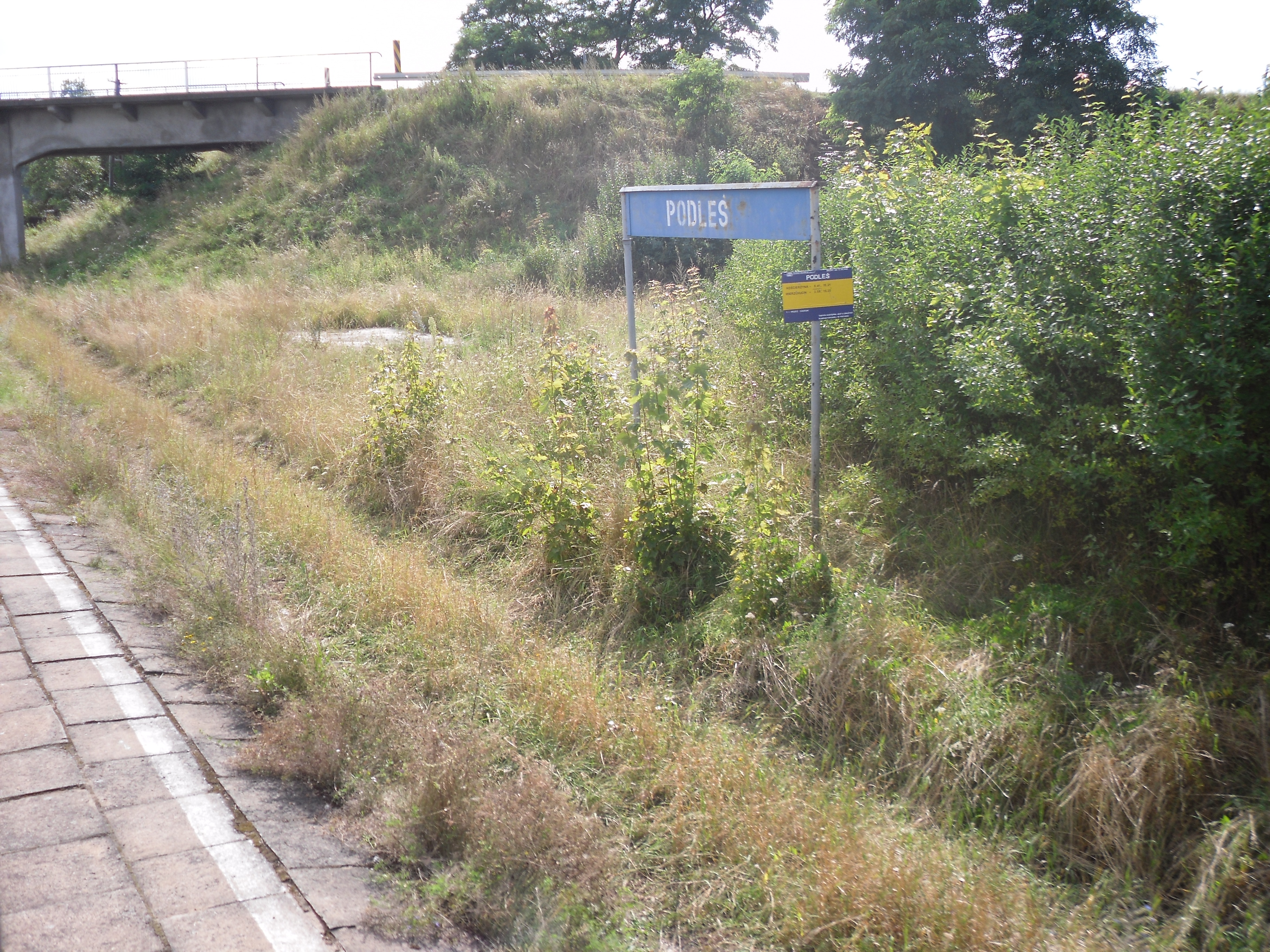

General information
- Location: Nowy Podleś; Poland
- Owner: Polskie Koleje Państwowe S.A.
- Platforms: 1

Construction
- Structure type: Building: Never existed Depot: Never existed Water tower: Never existed

History
- Former names: Poldersee
Location

Podleś is a disused PKP railway station in Nowy Podleś (Pomeranian Voivodeship), Poland.

== Lines crossing the station ==
Start station	End station	Line type
Nowa Wieś Wielka	Gdynia Port Centralny	Passenger/Freight
