= PUC =

PUC or P.U.C. may refer to:

== Education ==
- Pacific Union College
- Pre-university course
- Pentecost University College
- Premier University, Chittagong
- Pontifical Catholic University (from Pontificia Universidad(e) Católica)
  - Pontifical Catholic University of Chile, in Santiago
- Purdue University Calumet, a former branch of Purdue University and now a campus of Purdue University Northwest

== Organizations ==
- Postal Union Congress, a meeting of the Universal Postal Union
- Public utilities commission

== Sports ==
- Paris Université Club, multi-sports club in Paris, France
  - Paris Université Club (rugby union), rugby union section of the multi-sports club
  - Paris Université Club (baseball), baseball section of the multi-sports club
  - Paris Université Club (basketball), basketball section of the multi-sports club

== Other ==
- Personal unblocking code for 3GPP phones, or personal unlocking key (PUK)
- Pathé Unlimited Card, a pass for unlimited entrance at all Pathé movie theaters in the Netherlands
- Presidential Unit Citation (disambiguation), an award bestowed to military units by some countries
- Principle of Universal Causation, in philosophy

== See also ==
- Puc (disambiguation)
- PuC, plutonium carbide
