= Nowy Podleś =

Nowy Podleś Nowi Pòdles
- Village

- Location within Poland
- Coordinates: 54°5′32″N 18°1′2″E
- Country: Poland
- Voivodeship: Pomeranian
- County: Kościerzyna
- Gmina: Kościerzyna
- Population: 106

Nowy Podleś (Polish pronunciation: [ˈnɔvɨ ˈpɔdlɛɕ]; Kashubian: Nowi Pòdles) is a village in the administrative district of Gmina Kościerzyna, within Kościerzyna County, Pomeranian Voivodeship, in northern Poland.

For details of the history of the region, see History of Pomerania.
