= KLOQ =

KLOQ can mean:

- KLOQ-FM, a Californian FM radio station
- KLOQ (band), a British electronic rock band
