= Klock =

Klock is a Dutch/German surname. It may refer to:

- Fort Klock, New York State
- Fredrik Klock, a Norwegian footballer
- Jacob Klock, Colonel in the Tryon County militia during the American Revolution
- James Klock, a Canadian politician
