= Leon Podles =

American author

Leon J. Podles is an American author.

Podles attended Calvert Hall. He graduated from Providence College with a BA and received a PhD in medieval English and Icelandic literature from the University of Virginia.

In 2001, Podles and his wife Mary Elizabeth, donated more than $1.5 million to endow the Kennedy Smith Chair in Catholic Studies at McGill University in memory of Mary Elizabeth's father.

== Books ==
- The Church Impotent: The Feminization of Christianity (1999)
- Sacrilege: Sexual Abuse in the Catholic Church (Crossland Foundation Press, 2007)
- Losing the Good Portion: Why Men Are Alienated from Christianity (St. Augustines Press, 2020)
