= Kościerzyna County =

Kościerzyna County Powiat kościerski
- County
- Flag Coat of arms

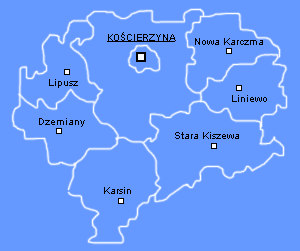
- Division into gminas
- Coordinates (Kościerzyna): 54°7′N 17°59′E
- Country: Poland
- Voivodeship: Pomeranian
- Seat: Kościerzyna
- Gminas: Total 8 (incl. 1 urban): Kościerzyna; Gmina Dziemiany; Gmina Karsin; Gmina Kościerzyna; Gmina Liniewo; Gmina Lipusz; Gmina Nowa Karczma; Gmina Stara Kiszewa

Area
  - Total: 1,165.85 km^{2} (450.14 sq mi)

Population (2019)
  - Total: 72,589
  - Density: 62.263/km^{2} (161.26/sq mi)
  - Urban: 23,776
  - Rural: 48,813
- Car plates: GKS
- Website: www.powiatkoscierski.pl

Kościerzyna County (Kashubian: Kòscérsczi kréz, Polish: powiat kościerski) is a unit of territorial administration and local government (powiat) in Pomeranian Voivodeship, northern Poland. It came into being on 1 January 1999 as a result of the Polish local government reforms passed in 1998. Its administrative seat and only town is Kościerzyna, which lies 51 kilometres (32 mi) south-west of the regional capital Gdańsk. Its borders equal approximately the borders of the old Marquessate of Berent in the German Empire.

The county covers an area of 1,165.85 square kilometres (450.1 sq mi). As of 2019 its total population is 72,589, out of which the population of Kościerzyna is 23,776, and the rural population is 48,813.

Kościerzyna County on a map of the counties of Pomeranian Voivodeship

Kościerzyna County is bordered by Kartuzy County to the north, Gdańsk County and Starogard County to the east, Chojnice County to the south, and Bytów County to the west.

== History ==
Before the First Partition of the First Polish Republic in 1772, there was a non-town Kościerzyna County Council. During the Prussian partition in 1818–1919, the Prussian district "Landkreis Berent" functioned. In the years 1920-1939 (the Second Polish Republic) and 1945-1975 (PRL) there was a Kościerzyna Land District. In the period of September 1939 - February / March 1945, the area of the county was under German occupation.

In 1920, the county granted to Poland covered the area of 117,698 ha and was smaller than its Prussian counterpart of 6,301 ha, which left for the Free City of Gdańsk (villages of Częstocin, Trzepowo, Gromadzin, Czarna Huta, Borowina, Olszanka, Sucha Huta, and Pawłowo).

== Administrative divisions ==
The county is subdivided into eight gminas (one urban and seven rural). These are listed in the following table, in descending order of population.

Gmina	Type	Area (km^{2})	Population (2019)	Seat
Kościerzyna	urban	15.8	23,776	
Gmina Kościerzyna	rural	310.2	16,036	Kościerzyna *
Gmina Nowa Karczma	rural	113.3	6,992	Nowa Karczma
Gmina Stara Kiszewa	rural	213.1	6,810	Stara Kiszewa
Gmina Karsin	rural	169.2	6,252	Karsin
Gmina Liniewo	rural	110.1	4,596	Liniewo
Gmina Dziemiany	rural	125.0	4,391	Dziemiany
Gmina Lipusz	rural	109.2	3,736	Lipusz
* seat not part of the gmina
