= Szatarpy =

- Village
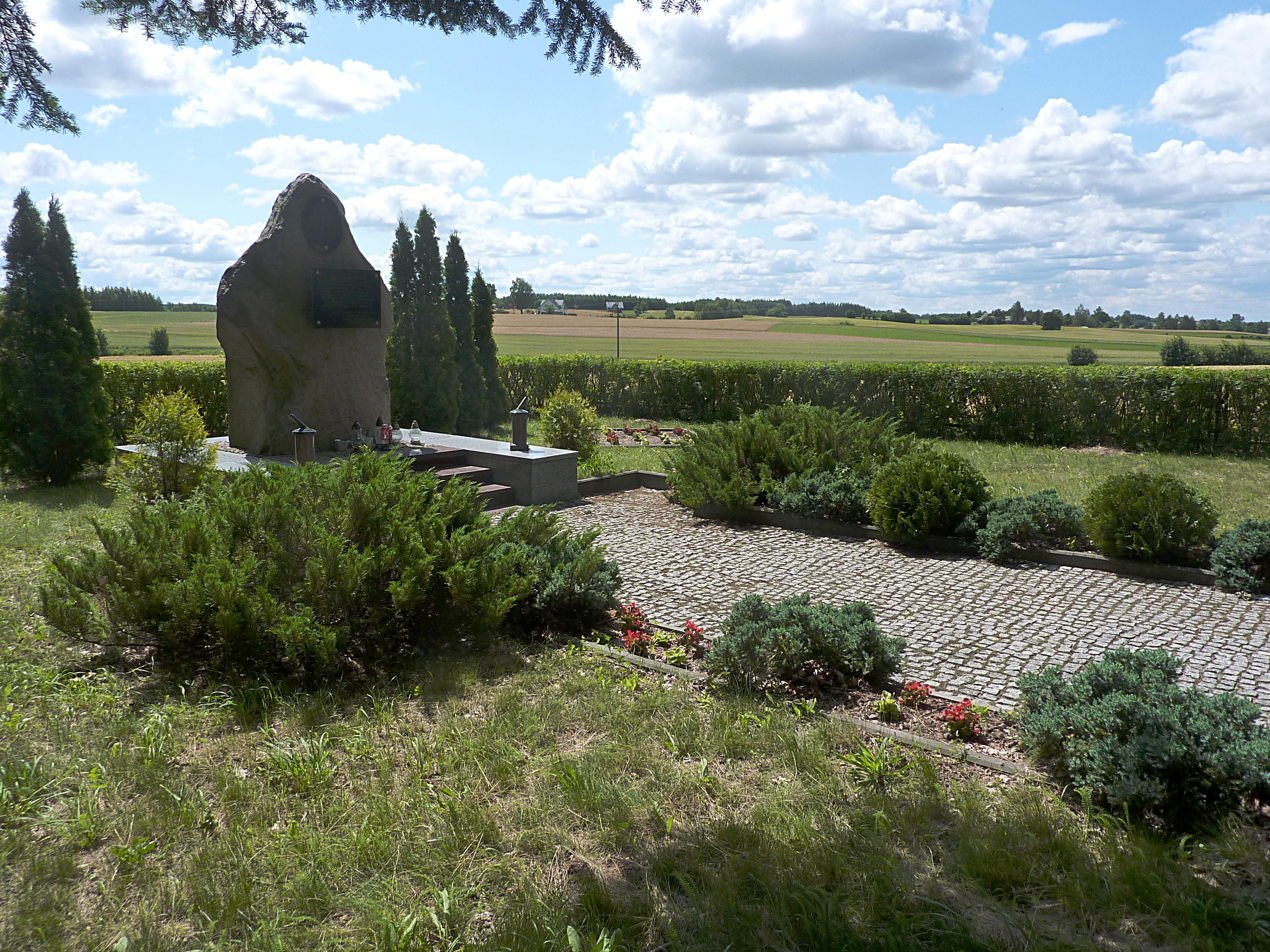
- Franciszek Hynek memorial stone in Szatarpy

- Location within Poland
- Coordinates: 54°8′24″N 18°18′21″E
- Country: Poland
- Voivodeship: Pomeranian
- County: Kościerzyna
- Gmina: Nowa Karczma
- Population (2022): 323
- Time zone: UTC+1 (CET)
  - Summer (DST): UTC+2 (CEST)
- Vehicle registration: GKS

Szatarpy [ʂaˈtarpɨ] is a village in the administrative district of Gmina Nowa Karczma, within Kościerzyna County, Pomeranian Voivodeship, in northern Poland. It is located within the ethnocultural region of Kashubia in the historic region of Pomerania.

== History ==
Szatarpy dates back to medieval Poland. In 1294, it was acquired by Wisław, Bishop of Włocławek. The acquisition was confirmed by Duke Mestwin II, who also granted new privileges to the village. Szatarpy was a private church village of the Diocese of Włocławek, administratively located in the Tczew County in the Pomeranian Voivodeship of the Polish Crown.

In 1885, it had a population of 499, predominantly of Catholic confession.

During the German occupation of Poland (World War II), in 1939, the Germans murdered several Polish farmers from Szatarpy during massacres of Poles carried out in the forest between Skarszewy and Więckowy as part of the Intelligenzaktion. In November and December 1939, the German gendarmerie and Selbstschutz expelled 80 Poles from the village, including families of Poles murdered near Skarszewy. The expellees were sent to the transit camp in Wysin, and then deported either to forced labour or to the General Government (German-occupied central Poland), while their farms were handed over to German colonists as part of the Lebensraum policy.

On September 8, 1958, Franciszek Hynek, Major of the Polish Army and two-time winner of the Gordon Bennett Cup, died in a balloon crash in Szatarpy. There is a memorial stone at the crash site.
