= Garczyn railway station =

Railway station in Gmina Kościerzyna, Poland

Garczyn
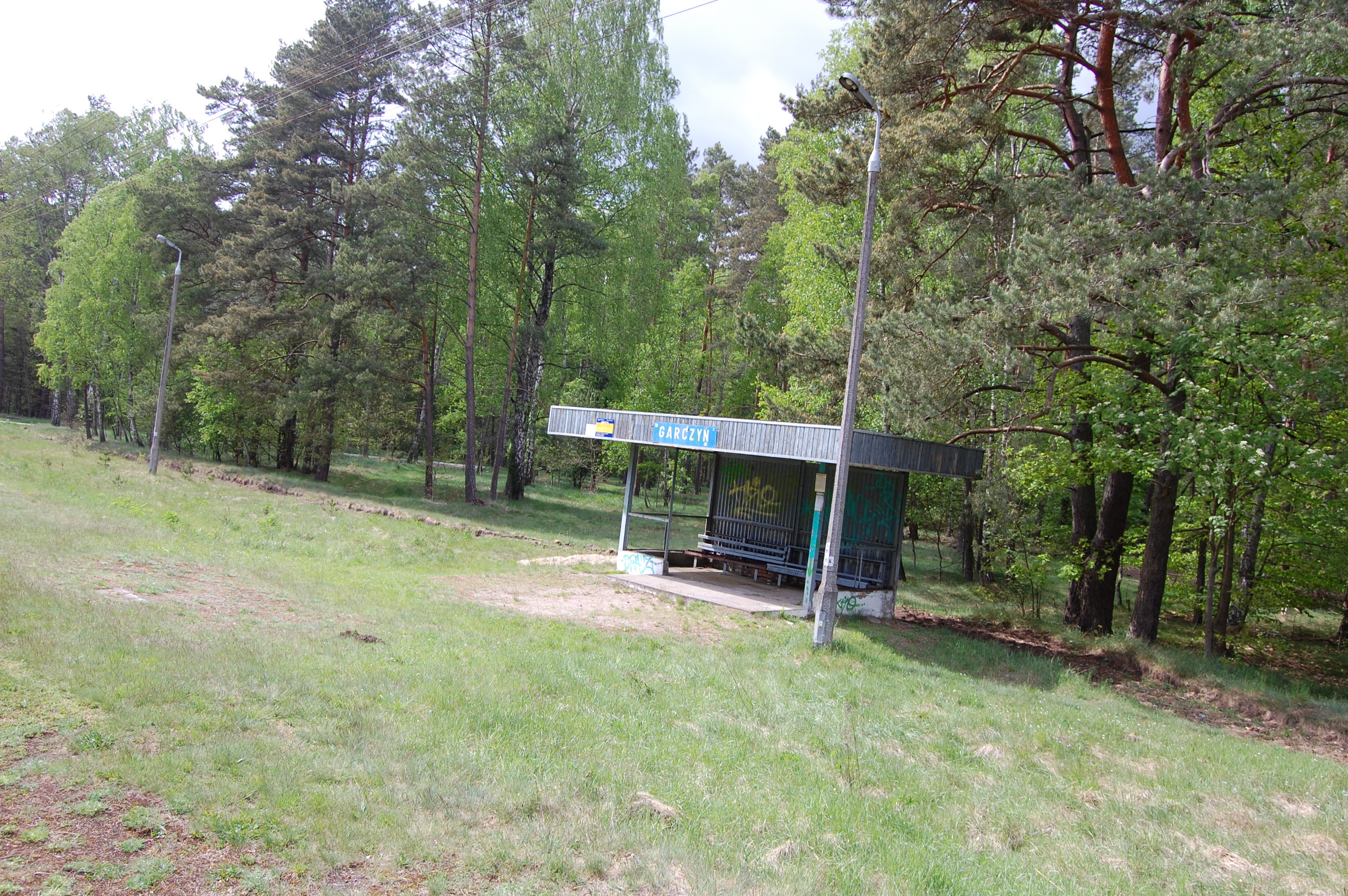

General information
- Location: Garczyn; Poland
- Coordinates: 54.123847°N 17.910897°E
- Owner: Polskie Koleje Państwowe S.A.
- Platforms: 1

Construction
- Structure type: Building: Never existed Depot: Never existed Water tower: Never existed

History
- Former names: Garzin until 1945
Location

Garczyn is a PKP railway station in Garczyn (Pomeranian Voivodeship), Poland.

== Lines crossing the station ==
Start station	End station	Line type
Chojnice	Kościerzyna	Passenger/Freight
