= Brzęczek (disambiguation) =

Brzęczek is a settlement in the administrative district in Poland.

Brzęczek may also refer to:

- Jerzy Brzęczek, a Polish professional football manager and former player
- Richard J. Brzeczek, a former law enforcement official
