= Waldemar Bonkowski =

Polish politician

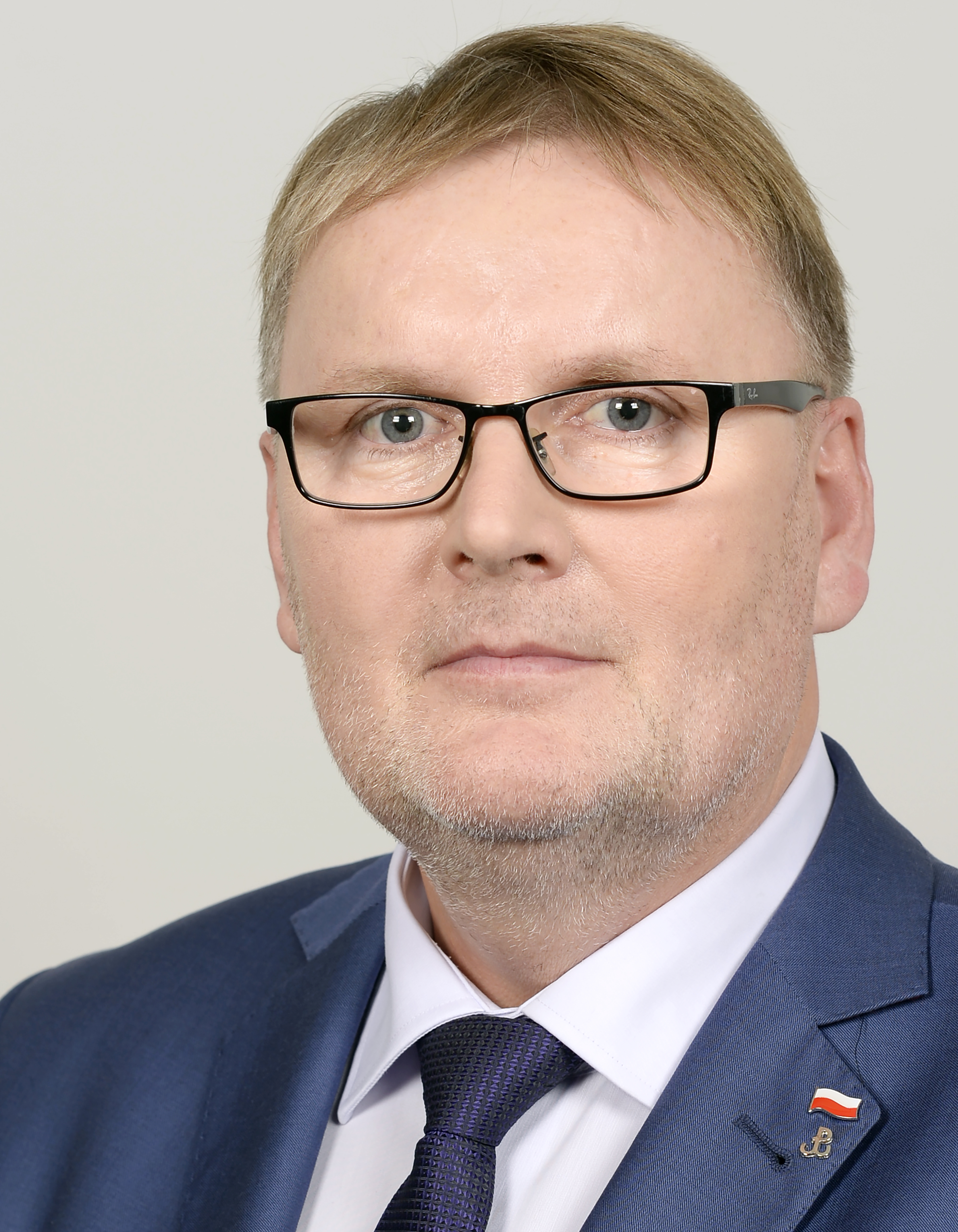
- Official portrait, 2015

Member of the Senate
- In office 12 November 2015 – 11 November 2019
- Preceded by: Roman Zaborowski
- Succeeded by: Stanisław Lamczyk
- Constituency: 63 (Gdynia)

Personal details
- Born: 10 August 1959 (age 66) Gdańsk, Poland
- Party: Independent (since 2018)
- Other political affiliations: Centre Agreement (until 2001); Law and Justice (2001–2018)

Waldemar Bonkowski (born 10 August 1959) is a Polish politician who served as a member of the Senate from the 63rd constituency from 2015 to 2019. He was a member of Law and Justice until 2018, when he was expelled from the party for a series of antisemitic social media posts.

== Early life and career ==
Waldemar Bonkowski was born on 10 August 1959 in Gdańsk to Teodor and Zofia (née Brzezińska) Bonkowski. In 1977, after receiving a basic vocational education, he became a carpenter. From 1979 to 2005 Bonkowski directed a carpentry workshop. He was also involved in the trade of goods and food preparation. During this time, he purchased a seven-hectare plot of land in Jednówka (part of the village of Śledziowa Huta) and created a farm. In 1995, the total size of the farm expanded to approximately 400 hectares, making him one of the largest landowners in the Pomeranian Voivodeship.

== Political career ==
Bonkowski has stated that his interest in politics began during the 1980 Gdańsk shipyard strike, when he and his brother delivered food from his farm to members of Solidarity who were striking. He has stated that during his early life, he was attacked by members of ZOMO. He first met Lech and Jarosław Kaczyński in the early 1990s, while working as a member of Centre Agreement, and later followed the Kaczyńskis into the Law and Justice (Polish: Prawo i Sprawiedliwość; abbreviated PiS) party.

According to web portal Onet.pl, Bonkowski is located on the radical wing of PiS. Bonkowski has welcomed this description, saying, "I don't wear suits from Armani. I'm a front-line soldier — a waste of money." Media company Wirtualna Polska reported in 2018 that Bonkowski "became 'famous'" for his remarks on Africans and refugees, particularly with his statement that "these people cannot be civilised". He also referred to the Supreme Court of Poland as "old Bolshevik ghosts, UB widows and useful idiots," and in one instance compared Ewa Kopacz to Josef Mengele.

Prior to 2015, Bonkowski ran unsuccessfully in several elections, including the 1998 local elections (as a Solidarity Electoral Action candidate for Kartuzy County councillor), the 2001 parliamentary election, the 2002 local elections (as a POPiS proportional representative list candidate in the Pomeranian Voivodeship Sejmik) and parliamentary elections in 2005, 2007 and 2011. He was elected to the Pomeranian Voivodeship Sejmik in the 2006 local elections. He was expelled from the sejmik in 2010, a few months prior to the end of his term, after being fined for inciting someone to certify false information in a document. After the conviction was expunged, he was re-elected in the 2014 local elections.

=== Senate ===
Bonkowski was elected to the Senate of Poland for constituency no. 63 (representing Gdynia) in the 2015 Polish parliamentary election, defeating Civic Platform incumbent Roman Zaborowski. During his campaign, Bonkowski was noted in several news outlets for travelling across Poland in a lorry carrying large banners with slogans against Civic Platform, its politicians and homosexuals.

Bonkowski was expelled from PiS in February 2018 after making a series of antisemitic posts on social media, including reposting a Nazi German propaganda film depicting Jewish kapos beating other Jews to death. Another factor in his being expelled was his divorce; during proceedings, he was accused by his wife of domestic abuse, and prior to his divorce he had openly cheated on his wife. He continued to sit in the Senate as an independent following his removal from the party.

Bonkowski ran as an independent in the 2019 Polish parliamentary election. He got 12% of the vote, placing third behind PiS candidate Dariusz Drelich and Civic Coalition candidate (and winner) Stanisław Lamczyk.

== Animal abuse conviction ==
In early April 2021, Bonkowski was arrested under suspicion of aggravated animal abuse. In footage released by police, he was shown tying a dog to his vehicle's tow hitch and dragging it through the road. Bonkowski rejected the accusations as 'absurd', claiming that he had tied the dog to his vehicle and driven away in order to "bring it home". The dog died as a result of being dragged by Bonkowski's vehicle, and he later buried it on his property. In April 2022, Bonkowski was found guilty of aggravated animal abuse and given a suspended sentence.

In April 2024, following an appeal, Bonkowski's sentence was increased to thee months of imprisonment and a year of community service. Bonkowski did not appear for his sentencing, and in June of that year the district court in Kościerzyna issued a warrant for his arrest. The next month, he was apprehended and taken into custody while in Poland. He denied that he had been in hiding, expressing a willingness to serve his prison sentence. In late August 2024, by court order, he was released. He served the remainder of his sentence with an electronic tag.

In mid-December 2024, a court determined that Bonkowski was not required to perform community service. The prosecution appealed the court's verdict, and the appeal was later upheld. Despite this, Bonkowski did not complete his community service, citing ill health. In March 2025, Bonkowski was found living in Hungary under the assumed name of Henryk Trezecinski.
