= Grabówko =

Grabówko may refer to the following places:

- Grabówko, Kuyavian-Pomeranian Voivodeship (north-central Poland)
- Grabówko, Masovian Voivodeship (east-central Poland)
- Grabówko, Kościerzyna County in Pomeranian Voivodeship (north Poland)
- Grabówko, Kwidzyn County in Pomeranian Voivodeship (north Poland)
- Grabówko, Słupsk County in Pomeranian Voivodeship (north Poland)
- Grabówko, Warmian-Masurian Voivodeship (north Poland)
- Grabówko, West Pomeranian Voivodeship (north-west Poland)
