= Skrzydłowo =

Skrzydłowo may refer to:

- Skrzydłowo, Pomeranian Voivodeship, Poland
- Skrzydłowo, West Pomeranian Voivodeship, Poland
