= Głodowo, Kościerzyna County =

Village in Kociewie

Głodowo
- Village
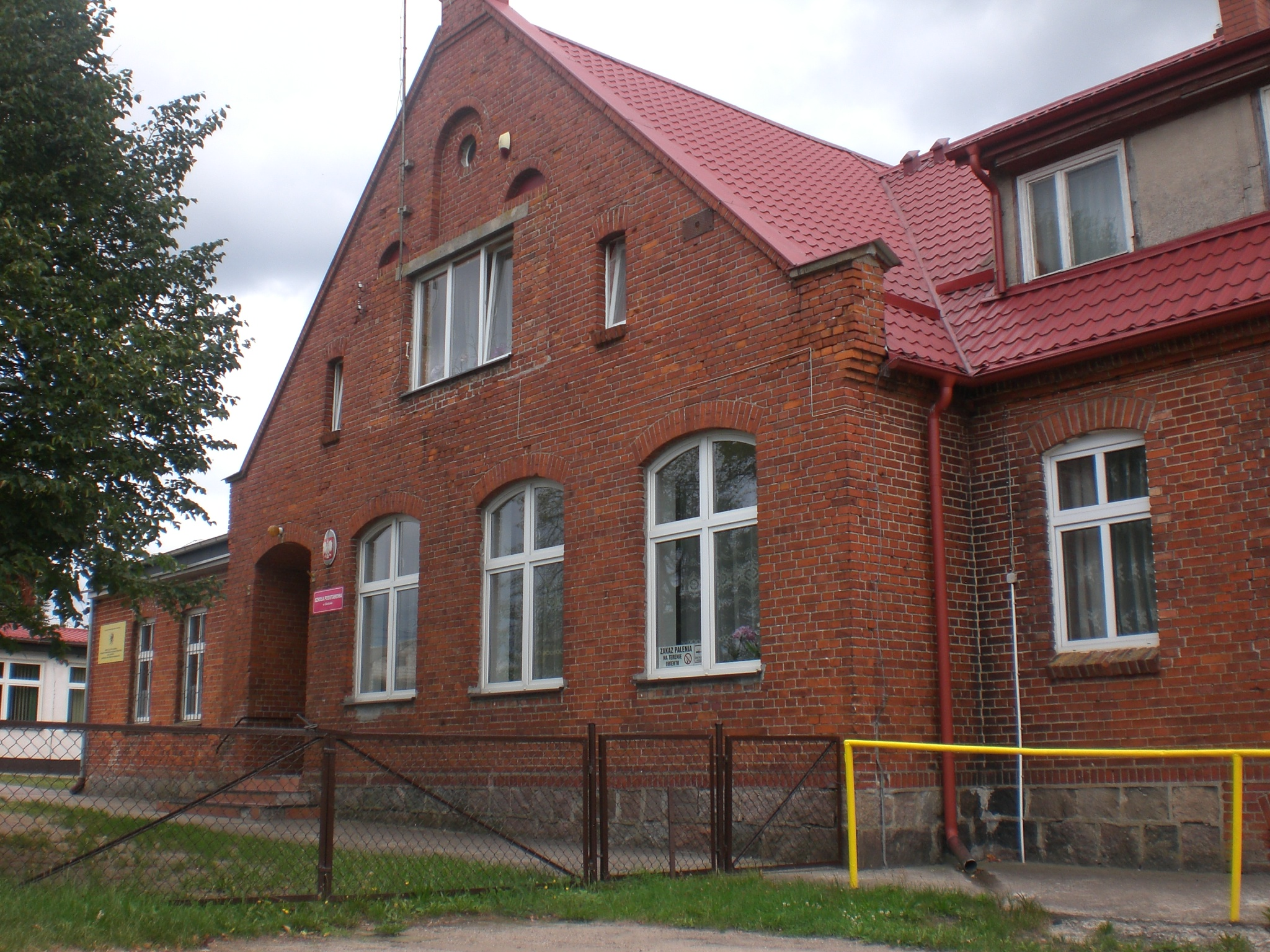
- Primary school in Głodowo

- Location within Poland
- Coordinates: 54°4′17″N 18°18′56″E
- Country: Poland
- Voivodeship: Pomeranian
- County: Kościerzyna
- Gmina: Liniewo
- Population: 460
- Time zone: UTC+1 (CET)
  - Summer (DST): UTC+2 (CEST)
- Vehicle registration: GKS

Głodowo [ɡwɔˈdɔvɔ] is a village in the administrative district of Gmina Liniewo, within Kościerzyna County, Pomeranian Voivodeship, in northern Poland. It is located within the historic region of Pomerania.

== History ==
Głodowo was a private church village of the monastery in Pelplin, administratively located in the Tczew County in the Pomeranian Voivodeship of the Polish Crown.

During the German occupation of Poland (World War II), in 1939, expelled Poles from nearby Wysin and Kościerzyna were brought by the Germans to Głodowo, and then deported in freight trains from the local station to the Siedlce County in German-occupied central Poland. In 1939–1941, the occupiers also carried out expulsions of Poles from Głodowo, whose farms were then handed over to Germans in accordance with the Lebensraum policy. Some of the expellees were deported to forced labour in Germany.
