= Iłownica =

Iłownica may refer to the following places in Poland:

- Iłownica, Pomeranian Voivodeship (north Poland)
- Iłownica, Silesian Voivodeship (south Poland)
- Iłownica River, a river in Silesian Voivodeship
