= Lubieszyn =

Lubieszyn may refer to:

- Lubieszyn, a village in Pomeranian Voivodeship, Poland
- Lubieszyn, a hamlet in West Pomeranian Voivodeship, Poland
