= Rekownica =

Rekownica could refer to:

- Rekownica, a stream in Poland, a right-hand tributary of Omulew
- Rekownica, a village in Pomeranian Voivodeship of Poland
- Rekownica, a village in Warmian–Masurian Voivodeship of Poland
