= Lubieszynek, Gmina Nowa Karczma =

Lubieszynek
- Village
- Location within Poland
- Coordinates: 54°6′50″N 18°12′48″E
- Country: Poland
- Voivodeship: Pomeranian
- County: Kościerzyna
- Gmina: Nowa Karczma
- Population (2022): 163

Lubieszynek [lubjɛˈʂɨnɛk] is a village located in the administrative district of Gmina Nowa Karczma within Kościerzyna County, Pomeranian Voivodeship in northern Poland.

For details of the history of the region, see History of Pomerania.
