= Deka, Pomeranian Voivodeship =

Village in Kociewie

Deka
- Village
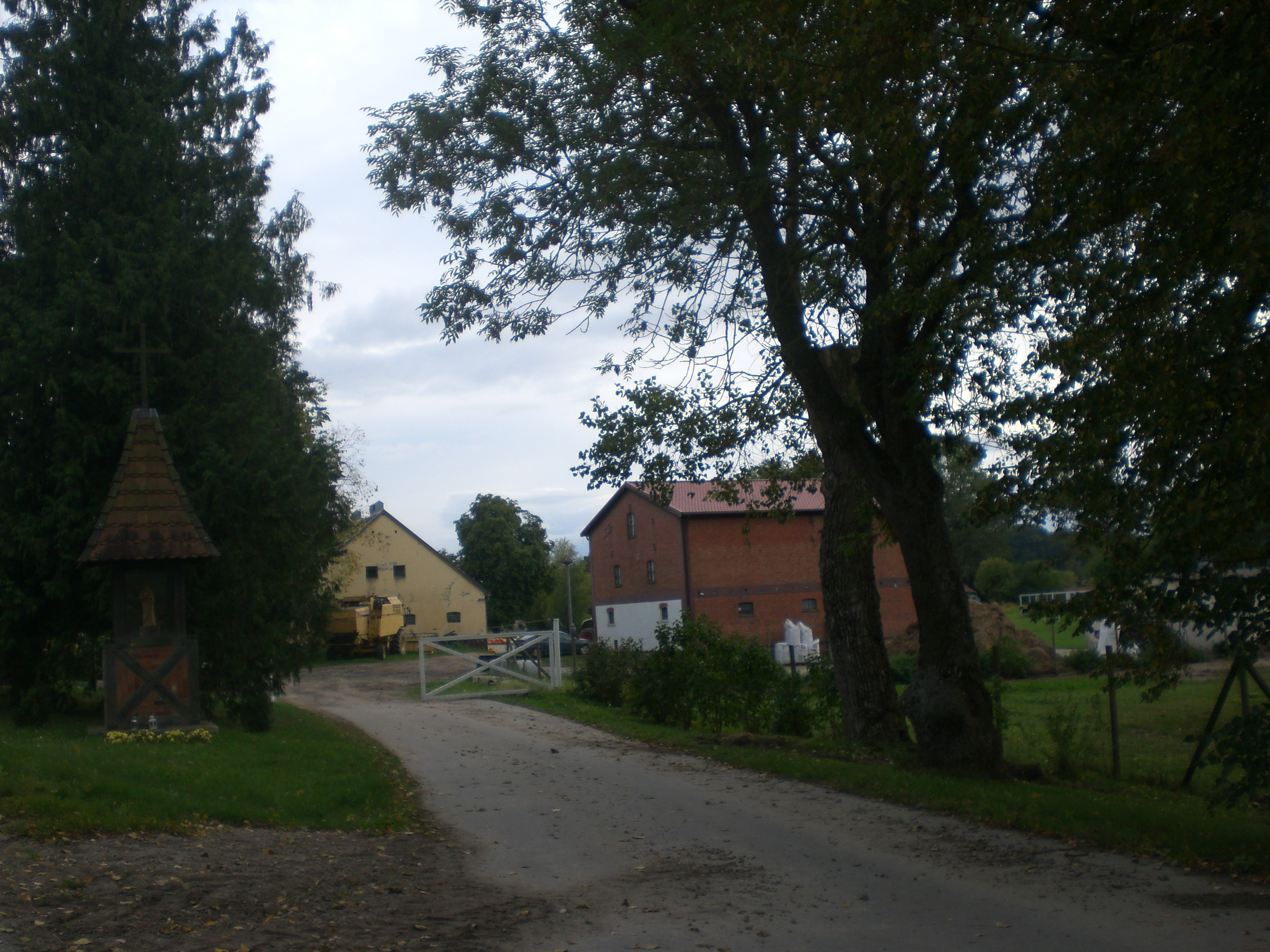
- A farm in the village

- Location within Poland
- Coordinates: 54°3′30″N 18°20′15″E
- Country: Poland
- Voivodeship: Pomeranian
- County: Kościerzyna
- Gmina: Liniewo
- Population: 45

Deka [ˈdɛka] is a village in the administrative district of Gmina Liniewo, within Kościerzyna County, Pomeranian Voivodeship, in northern Poland.

For details of the history of the region, see History of Pomerania.
