= Olszowy Kiesz =

Olszowy Kierz
- Settlement
- Location within Poland
- Coordinates: 54°7′3″N 18°13′47″E
- Country: Poland
- Voivodeship: Pomeranian
- County: Kościerzyna
- Gmina: Nowa Karczma
- Population (2022): 10

Olszowy Kierz [ɔlˈʂɔvɨ ˈkʲɛʐ] is a settlement in the administrative district of Gmina Nowa Karczma, within Kościerzyna County, Pomeranian Voivodeship, in northern Poland.

For details of the history of the region, see History of Pomerania.
