= Szpon, Pomeranian Voivodeship =

Szpon
- Village
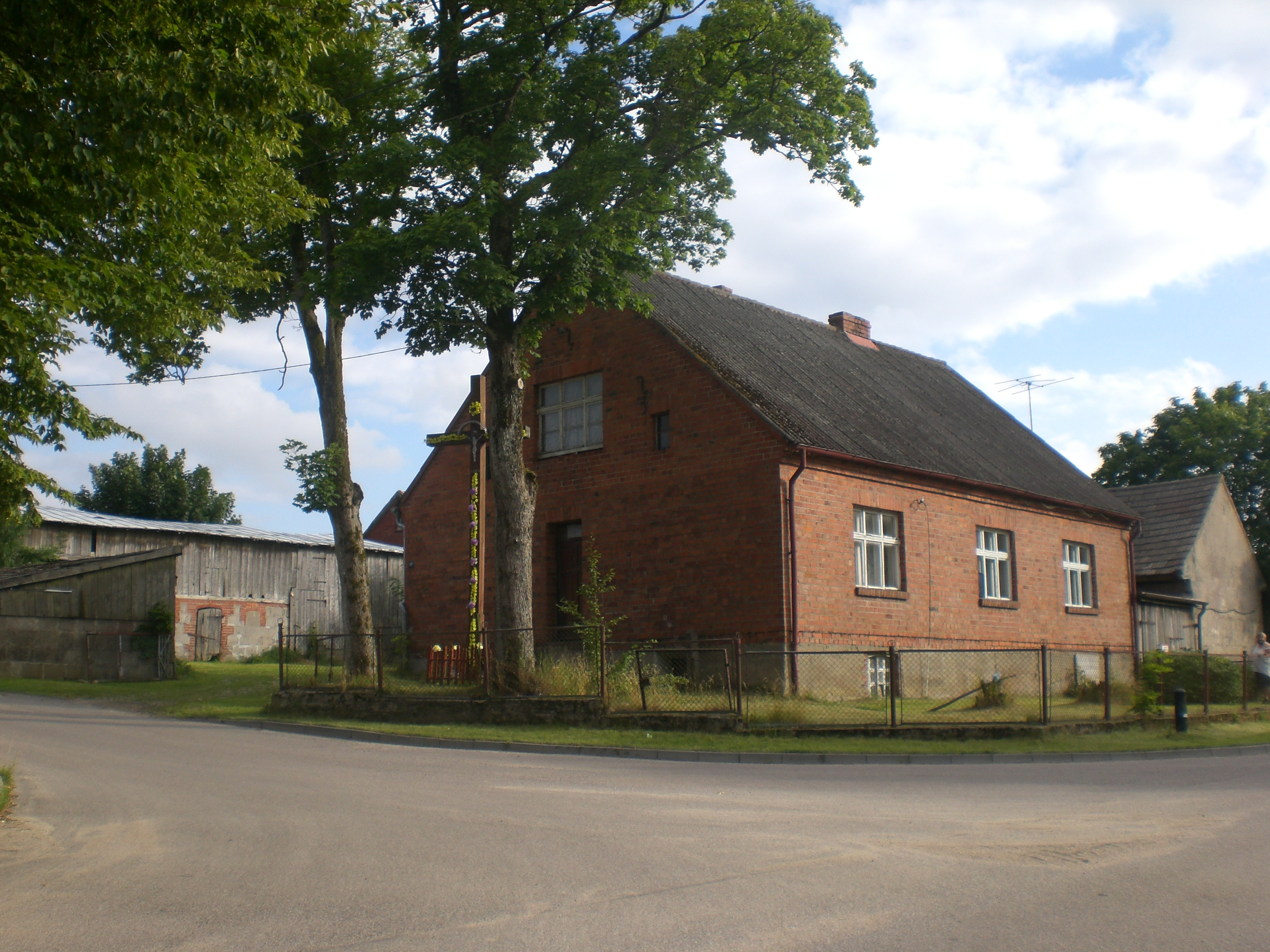

- Location within Poland
- Coordinates: 54°11′3″N 18°12′30″E
- Country: Poland
- Voivodeship: Pomeranian
- County: Kościerzyna
- Gmina: Nowa Karczma
- Population (2022): 86

Szpon [ʂpɔn] is a village in the administrative district of Gmina Nowa Karczma, within Kościerzyna County, Pomeranian Voivodeship, in northern Poland.

For details of the history of the region, see History of Pomerania.
