= Liniewo =

- Village
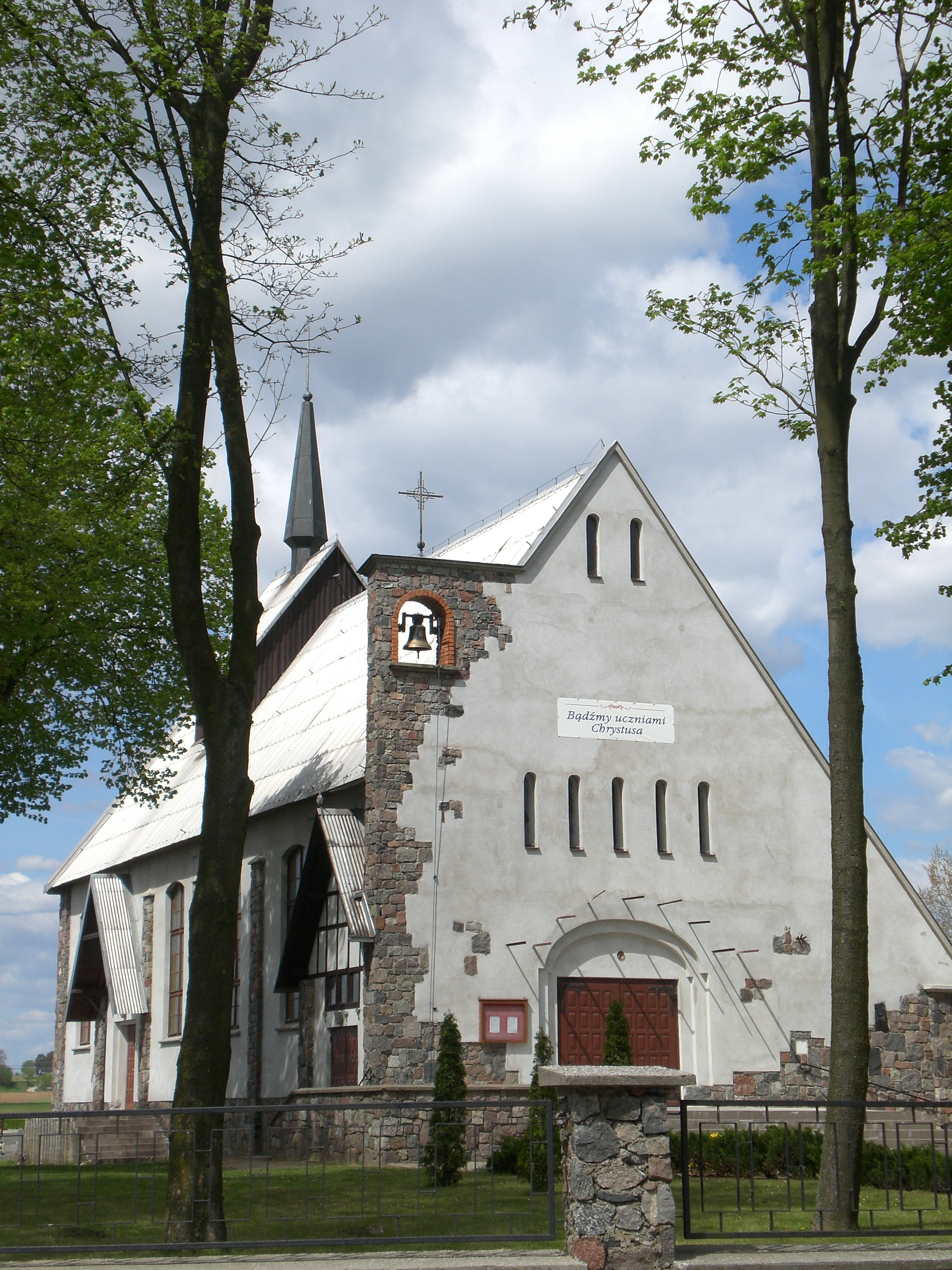
- Church of the Divine Mercy

- Location within Poland
- Coordinates: 54°4′33″N 18°13′37″E
- Country: Poland
- Voivodeship: Pomeranian
- County: Kościerzyna
- Gmina: Liniewo

Population
  - Total: 1,178
- Time zone: UTC+1 (CET)
  - Summer (DST): UTC+2 (CEST)
- Vehicle registration: GKS
- Website: https://www.liniewo.pl/

Liniewo [liˈɲɛvɔ] is a village in Kościerzyna County, Pomeranian Voivodeship, in northern Poland. It is the seat of the gmina (administrative district) called Gmina Liniewo. It is located in the historic region of Pomerania.

== History ==
Liniewo was a private village of the Pierzcha noble family of Flądra coat of arms, administratively located in the Tczew County in the Pomeranian Voivodeship of the Kingdom of Poland. It was annexed by Prussia in the First Partition of Poland in 1772. Following World War I, Poland regained independence and control of the village.

During the German occupation of Poland (World War II), Liniewo was one of the sites of executions of Poles, carried out by the Germans in 1939 as part of the Intelligenzaktion. Local Polish teachers were among the victims of the massacre in Skarszewy forest, perpetrated by the SS, Gestapo and Selbstschutz in 1939, also as part of the Intelligenzaktion. In November 1939, the Selbstschutz expelled 60 Polish inhabitants from Liniewo. Further expulsions of Poles were carried out in 1940 by the SS. Liniewo was also the location of a temporary transit camp for Poles expelled from other nearby villages, from which they were eventually deported to the Potulice concentration camp. In 1944, Poles expelled from other villages in the county were enslaved as forced labour of new German colonists in Liniewo.
