= Grabowska Huta =

- Village
- Location within Poland
- Coordinates: 54°11′5″N 18°10′10″E
- Country: Poland
- Voivodeship: Pomeranian
- County: Kościerzyna
- Gmina: Nowa Karczma
- Population (2022): 226

Grabowska Huta [ɡraˈbɔfska ˈxuta] is a village in the administrative district of Gmina Nowa Karczma, within Kościerzyna County, Pomeranian Voivodeship, in northern Poland.

For details of the history of the region, see History of Pomerania.
