= Bukowe Pole, Pomeranian Voivodeship =

Bukowe Pole
- Settlement
- Location within Poland
- Coordinates: 54°4′59″N 18°9′32″E
- Country: Poland
- Voivodeship: Pomeranian
- County: Kościerzyna
- Gmina: Liniewo
- Population: 32

Bukowe Pole [buˈkɔvɛ ˈpɔlɛ] is a settlement in the administrative district of Gmina Liniewo, within Kościerzyna County, Pomeranian Voivodeship, in northern Poland.

For details of the history of the region, see History of Pomerania.
