= Nowa Karczma, Gmina Nowa Karczma =

Nowa Karczma
- Village
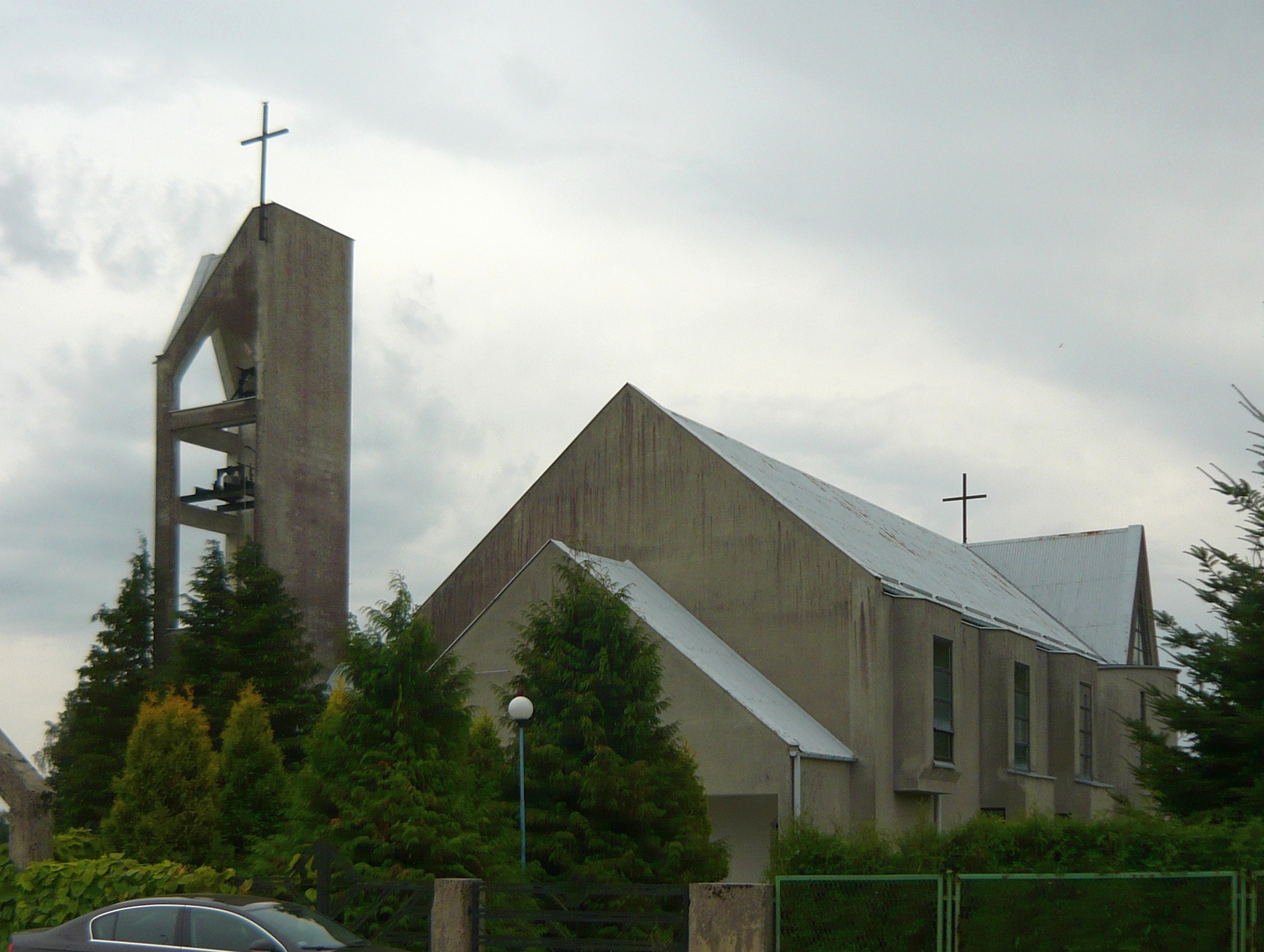
- Church of Saint Anthony of Padua

- Location within Poland
- Coordinates: 54°8′0″N 18°12′9″E
- Country: Poland
- Voivodeship: Pomeranian
- County: Kościerzyna
- Gmina: Nowa Karczma

Population (2022)
  - Total: 989
- Website: http://www.nowakarczma.pl

Nowa Karczma [ˈnɔva ˈkart͡ʂma] is a village in Kościerzyna County, Pomeranian Voivodeship, in northern Poland. It is the seat of the gmina (administrative district) called Gmina Nowa Karczma. It is located in the ethnocultural region of Kashubia in the historic region of Pomerania.

Seven Polish citizens were murdered by Nazi Germany in the village during World War II.
