= Friedrich Franek =

Austrian general (1891–1976)

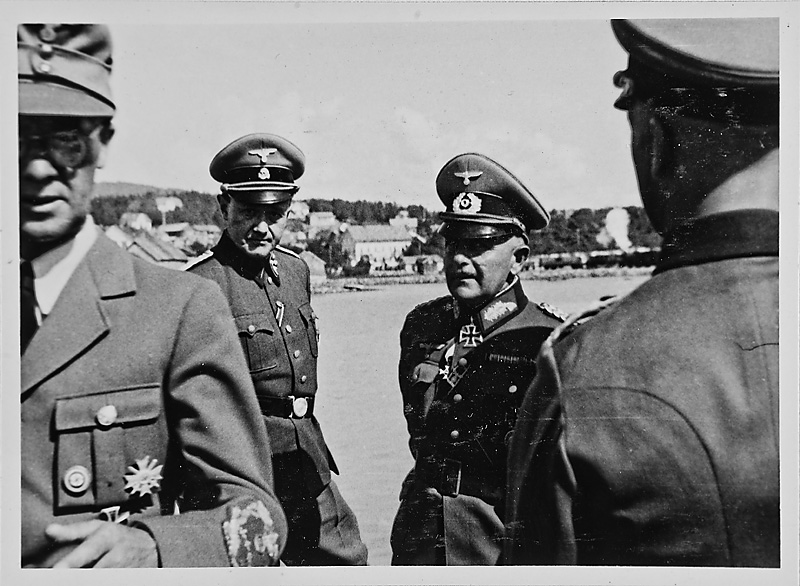
- General Franek (center) with Josef Terboven (far left in the foreground) in Norway in 1942.
- Born: 16 July 1891; Vienna, Austria-Hungary
- Died: 8 April 1976 (aged 84); Vienna-Ober St. Veit, Republic of Austria
- Relatives: ∞ 5 July 1926 Margarethe Rondonelli
- Military career
- Allegiance: (Austria-Hungary) Austria–Hungary; Republic of German-Austria; First Austrian Republic; Nazi Germany
- Branch: Austro-Hungarian Army; German-Austrian People's Militia; Bundesheer; Army (Wehrmacht)
- Service years: 1910–45
- Rank: Generalleutnant
- Commands: 196th Infantry Division; 44th Infantry Division; 73rd Infantry Division
- Conflicts: World War I World War II: Poland Campaign; Battle of France; Operation Barbarossa; Siege of Leningrad; Italian Campaign; Battle of Monte Cassino; Lublin–Brest Offensive
- Awards: Knight's Cross of the Iron Cross

Friedrich "Fritz" Mathias Felix Franek (16 July 1891 – 8 April 1976) was an Austrian general in the armed forces of Nazi Germany during World War II. Along with Alois Windisch, he was one of only two recipients of both the Knight's Cross of the Iron Cross and the Knight's Cross of the Military Order of Maria Theresa, the highest military honour of Austria-Hungary.

The son of a master baker, Franek joined the Austro-Hungarian Army in 1910 and served with distinction in World War I, winning the Gold Medal for Bravery. On 10 June 1921, the Chapter of the Military Order of Maria Theresa awarded Franek the Knight's Cross of the said Order in recognition of his conduct during the 11th Battle of the Isonzo. Had Franek received his appointment to the said Order before the abdication of the last Austro-Hungarian monarch, he would also have received a title of nobility as specified in the Statutes of the Military Order of Maria Theresa of 1895. Titles of nobility having been abolished in the Republic of Austria in 1919, Franek did not receive any such title in Austria.

After the end of the war, Franek remained in the army of the newly established Austrian republic. In 1925 he graduated with a PhD in political science.

After the Anschluss, Franek transferred to the German armed forces. In the summer of 1944, Franek was commanding the German 73rd Infantry Division as the Red Army was advancing through Poland. At the end of July, during the Lublin–Brest Offensive, he joined battle at Garwolin with the Soviet 2nd Guards Tank Army under the command of Alexei Radzievsky, when the German forces were routed and Franek was taken prisoner. He was released in 1948.

== Awards and decorations ==
- Austro-Hungarian Mobilization Cross 1912/13
- Military Merit Cross (Austria-Hungary), 3rd Class with the War Decoration (ÖM3K) on 26 November 1914
  - When the "swords" were introduced to the war decoration on 13 December 1916, he was subsequently awarded this distinction.
- Austro-Hungarian Military Merit Medal (Signum Laudis) in Bronze on the ribbon for wartime merit in June 1915
  - once again for "courageous conduct in the face of the enemy," this time with the highest recognition of the Emperor; when the "swords" were introduced on 13 December 1916, he was subsequently awarded this distinction.
- Austro-Hungarian Military Merit Medal (Signum Laudis) in Silver on the ribbon for wartime merit on 6 November 1916
  - He was once again awarded the Emperor's highest commendation. When the "swords" were introduced on 13 December 1916, he was subsequently awarded this distinction.
- Austro-Hungarian Karl Troop Cross
- Prussian Iron Cross (1914), 2nd Class in late June 1917
- Wound Medal (Austria-Hungary) with two stripes
  - after the Anschluss in 1938 exchanged for the German Wound Badge (1918) in Black
- Medal for Bravery (Austria-Hungary) in Gold (probably awarded as early as the beginning of 1918, but only published on 6 December 1918)
- Military Order of Maria Theresa, Knight's Cross for his personal bravery and the proactive leadership of his company during the fighting for Hill 146 between 17 and 22 August 1917
  - The confirmed eligibility was only granted on 10 June 1921 by the 187th Chapter of the Military Order of Maria Theresa. Had this conferral occurred during the time of the Austro-Hungarian Monarchy, Franek would have automatically received the Austrian title of nobility (von Franek) and would also have been entitled to apply for elevation to the rank of Freiherr without paying the usual fees. However, this was not the case.
- Marian Cross of the Teutonic Knights
- Military Service Badge (Austria-Hungary) for Officers, 2nd Class (for 25 years)
- Hungarian World War Commemorative Medal with Swords
- Austrian War Commemorative Medal with Swords
- Military Merit Cross (Federal State of Austria), III. Class on 24 April 1936
- Wehrmacht Long Service Award, 4th to 1st Class (25-year Service Cross)
- Honour Cross of the World War 1914/1918 with Swords
- Repetition Clasp 1939 to the Iron Cross 1914, 2nd Class on 4 October 1939
- Iron Cross (1939), 1st Class on 1 November 1939
- Wound Badge (1939) in Silver on 10 November 1941
- Knight's Cross of the Iron Cross on 4 November 1941 as Colonel and Commander of the Infanterie-Regiment 405/121. Infanterie-Division
- Winter Battle in the East 1941–42 Medal on 26 July 1942 as Major General and Commander of the 196. Infanterie-Division
- Mentioned by name in the Wehrmacht report (Wehrmachtbericht) on 8 February 1944
- Richard Meister Medal on 10 March 1972

Military offices
Preceded by Generalleutnant Richard Pellengahr	Commander of 196. Infanterie-Division; 1 March 1942 – 24 December 1943	Succeeded by Generalleutnant Kurt Möhring
Preceded by Generalleutnant Dr. jur. Franz Beyer	Commander of 44. Reichs-Grenadier-Division Hoch und Deutschmeister; 1 January 1944 – 1 May 1944	Succeeded by Generalleutnant Bruno Ortner
Preceded by Generalmajor Johannes Nedtwig	Commander of 73. Infanterie-Division; 26 June 1944 – 29 July 1944	Succeeded by Generalmajor Kurt Haehling
