= Chrztowo =

- Village
- Location within Poland
- Coordinates: 54°3′29″N 18°10′17″E
- Country: Poland
- Voivodeship: Pomeranian
- County: Kościerzyna
- Gmina: Liniewo
- Population: 59

Chrztowo [ˈxʂtɔvɔ] is a village with a population of 80 in northern Poland. The village is within the administrative district of Gmina Liniewo, which is within Kościerzyna County, in the provincial region of the Pomeranian Voivodeship.

== See also ==
- History of Pomerania
