= 196th Infantry Division (Wehrmacht) =

- 196. Infanterie-Division
- Active: November 1939 - August 1944
- Country: Nazi Germany
- Branch: Army
- Type: Infantry
- Size: Division
- Engagements: World War II: Operation Weserübung

The 196th Infantry Division (German: 196. Infanterie-Division) was an infantry division of the German Heer during World War II.

== History ==
The 196th Infantry Division was assembled in the Danzig area of Wehrkreis XX, as a division of the seventh Aufstellungswelle, on 27 November 1939. For the initial deployment of the division, several replacement formations within Wehrkreis XX whose personnel consisted of recruits from Wehrkreis VI were used, including the Infantry Regiments 340 and 345, both with three battalions each, as well as the Light Artillery Detachment 233. The first divisional commander of the 196th Infantry Division, appointed on 27 November 1939, was Richard Pellengahr.

With only two regiments, the 196th Infantry Division was not yet a full infantry division, as such a division usually consisted of three rather than two infantry regiments. The 196th Infantry Division's third regiment was formed on 10 January 1940, when the division was assigned the field replacement battalions 6, 16 and 26. These battalions, staffed with recruits from Bielefeld, Münster and Cologne respectively, were combined to form Infantry Regiment 362. Additionally, the Light Artillery Detachment 233 had been strengthened through the addition of the staff of Artillery Regiment 311 (Wehrkreis I) and the 1st Detachment of Artillery Regiment 239 (Wehrkreis VIII) to become the full Artillery Regiment 233.

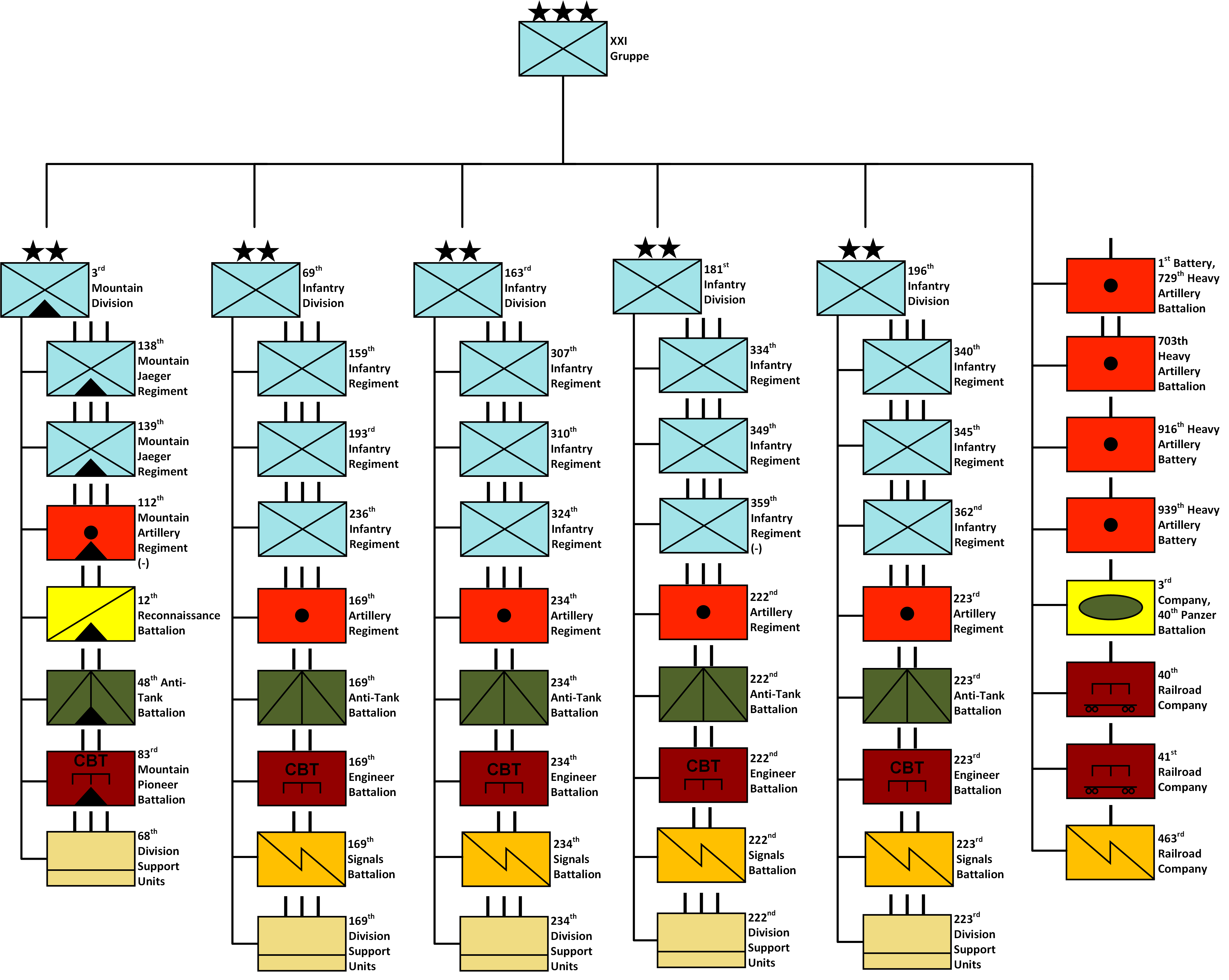
The structure of Group XXI for Operation Weserübung.

In April 1940, the 196th Infantry Division took part in Operation Weserübung as part of Group XXI.

On 11 September 1940, Infantry Regiment 345 and the 1st Detachment of Artillery Regiment 233 were taken out of the division and joined the 199th Infantry Division. On 17 September 1940, the Artillery Regiment was strengthened with an additional two batteries. After the removal of the 345th Regiment, the now binary 196th Infantry Division was equipped with basic mountaineer equipment.

On 1 March 1942, Friedrich Franek replaced Pellengahr as divisional commander.

The 1st Battalion of the 362nd Grenadier Regiment (Note: The Infantry Regiments were renamed Grenadier Regiments on 15 October 1942.) was assigned to Army Group Center on the Eastern Front in 1943, where it was dissolved and its personnel distributed to other forces. This battalion was replaced by a freshly deployed new battalion in September 1943.

The division, commanded by Kurt Möhring since 23 December 1943, was restructured to the model of an Ostdivision on 6 January 1944.

In February 1944, an Oberst Klinge took command of the division. He was replaced by Friedrich von Unger in June 1944.

In July 1944, parts of the division were transferred to Army Group Center. Both the Grenadier Regiment 340 and the Grenadier Regiment 362 were transferred to Lithuania, where they were destroyed shortly after, and dissolved on 15 September 1944. Units that were still in fighting shape were transferred to the 131st Infantry Division, whereas remnant formations unable to fight were given to the 361st Infantry Division in Wahn in Cologne.

The rump division that had remained in Norway consisted only of the Reconnaissance Detachment 233, later the 2nd Battalion of the Bicycle Reconnaissance Regiment Norway, and parts of the Artillery Regiment 233, later the 2nd Battalion of Artillery Regiment 269 as well as the Fortress Artillery Detachment 1048. As these remnant forces no longer justified to maintain an independent division, the 196th Infantry Division's bureaucracy was dissolved in August 1944.

== Superior formations ==
Operational chart of the 196th Infantry Division
Year	Month	Commander	Army Corps	Army	Army Group	Area of Operation
1939	December	Richard Pellengahr	Assembly of division, Wehrkreis XX			Danzig
1940	January – March	Richard Pellengahr	Assembly of division, Wehrkreis XX			Danzig
1940	June – August	Richard Pellengahr	Group XXI (formerly XXI Army Corps)			Norway
1940	September – December	Richard Pellengahr	XXXIII Corps	Group XXI	None	Norway
1941		Richard Pellengahr	XXXIII Corps	Armee Norwegen	None	Norway
1942	January – February	Richard Pellengahr	XXXIII Corps	Armee Norwegen	None	Norway
1942	March – December	Friedrich Franek	XXXIII Corps	Armee Norwegen	None	Norway
1943	January – June	Friedrich Franek	XXXIII Corps	Armee Norwegen	None	Norway
1943	July – December	Friedrich Franek	Army Reserves	Armee Norwegen	None	Norway
1944	January – February	Kurt Möhring	XXXIII Corps	Armee Norwegen	None	Norway
1944	February – June	Obrst. Klinge	XXXIII Corps	Armee Norwegen	None	Norway
1944	July	Friedrich von Unger	XXVI Corps	3rd Panzer Army	Army Group Center	Vilnius
1944	August	Friedrich von Unger	XXVII Corps	4th Army	Army Group Center	Alytus

== Noteworthy individuals ==
- Richard Pellengahr, divisional commander of the 196th Infantry Division (27 November 1939 – 1 March 1942).
- Friedrich Franek, divisional commander of the 196th Infantry Division (1 March 1942 – 23 December 1943).
- Kurt Möhring, divisional commander of the 196th Infantry Division (23 December 1943 – February 1944).
- Friedrich von Unger, divisional commander of the 196th Infantry Division (June 1944 – August 1944).
