= Kurt Möhring =

- Born: 3 January 1900; Groß Lipschin
- Died: 18 December 1944 (aged 44); Befort, Luxembourg
- Military career
- Allegiance: German Empire; Weimar Republic; Nazi Germany
- Branch: Army
- Service years: 1916–1944
- Rank: Generalleutnant (Posthumously)
- Commands: 196th Infantry Division; 276th Volksgrenadier Division
- Conflicts: World War II: Battle of the Bulge †
- Awards: Knight's Cross of the Iron Cross

Kurt Möhring (3 January 1900 – 18 December 1944) was a general in the Wehrmacht of Nazi Germany during World War II. He was a recipient of the Knight's Cross of the Iron Cross. Möhring was killed on 18 December 1944 in Befort, Luxembourg, during the Battle of the Bulge.

== Awards ==
- Knight's Cross of the Iron Cross on 18 July 1943 as Oberst and commander of Grenadier-Regiment 82

Military offices
Preceded by Generalleutnant Dr. Friedrich Franek	Commander of 196. Infanterie-Division; 24 December 1943 – February 1944	Succeeded by Oberst Klinge
Preceded by None	Commander of 276.Volksgrenadier-Division; 4 September 1944 – 18 December 1944	Succeeded by Generalmajor Hugo Dempwolff
