= Nowe Horniki =

- Village
- Location within Poland
- Coordinates: 54°8′11″N 18°13′45″E
- Country: Poland
- Voivodeship: Pomeranian
- County: Kościerzyna
- Gmina: Nowa Karczma

Nowe Horniki [ˈnɔvɛ xɔrˈniki] is a village in the administrative district of Gmina Nowa Karczma, within Kościerzyna County, Pomeranian Voivodeship, in northern Poland.

For additional historical details concerning this region, see History of Pomerania.
