= Horniki =

- Settlement
- Location within Poland
- Coordinates: 54°7′57″N 18°13′22″E
- Country: Poland
- Voivodeship: Pomeranian
- County: Kościerzyna
- Gmina: Nowa Karczma

Horniki [xɔrˈniki] is a settlement in the administrative district of Gmina Nowa Karczma, within Kościerzyna County, Pomeranian Voivodeship, in northern Poland.

For details of the history of the region, see History of Pomerania.
