= Richard Pellengahr =

German general

- Born: 19 August 1883; Wiedenbrück
- Died: 9 October 1964 (aged 81); Bielefeld
- Military career
- Allegiance: German Empire; Weimar Republic; Nazi Germany
- Branch: Army
- Rank: Generalleutnant
- Commands: 196th Infantry Division
- Conflicts: World War II
- Awards: Knight's Cross of the Iron Cross

Richard Pellengahr (19 August 1883 – 9 October 1964) was a German general (Generalleutnant) in the Wehrmacht during World War II. He was a recipient of the Knight's Cross of the Iron Cross of Nazi Germany.

== Awards ==
- Knight's Cross of the Iron Cross on 9 May 1940 as Generalleutnant and commander of the 196. Infanterie-Division

Military offices
Preceded by none	Commander of 196. Infanterie-Division; 27 December 1939 – 1 March 1942	Succeeded by Generalleutnant Dr. Friedrich Franek
