= Alois Windisch =

Austrian Nazi general

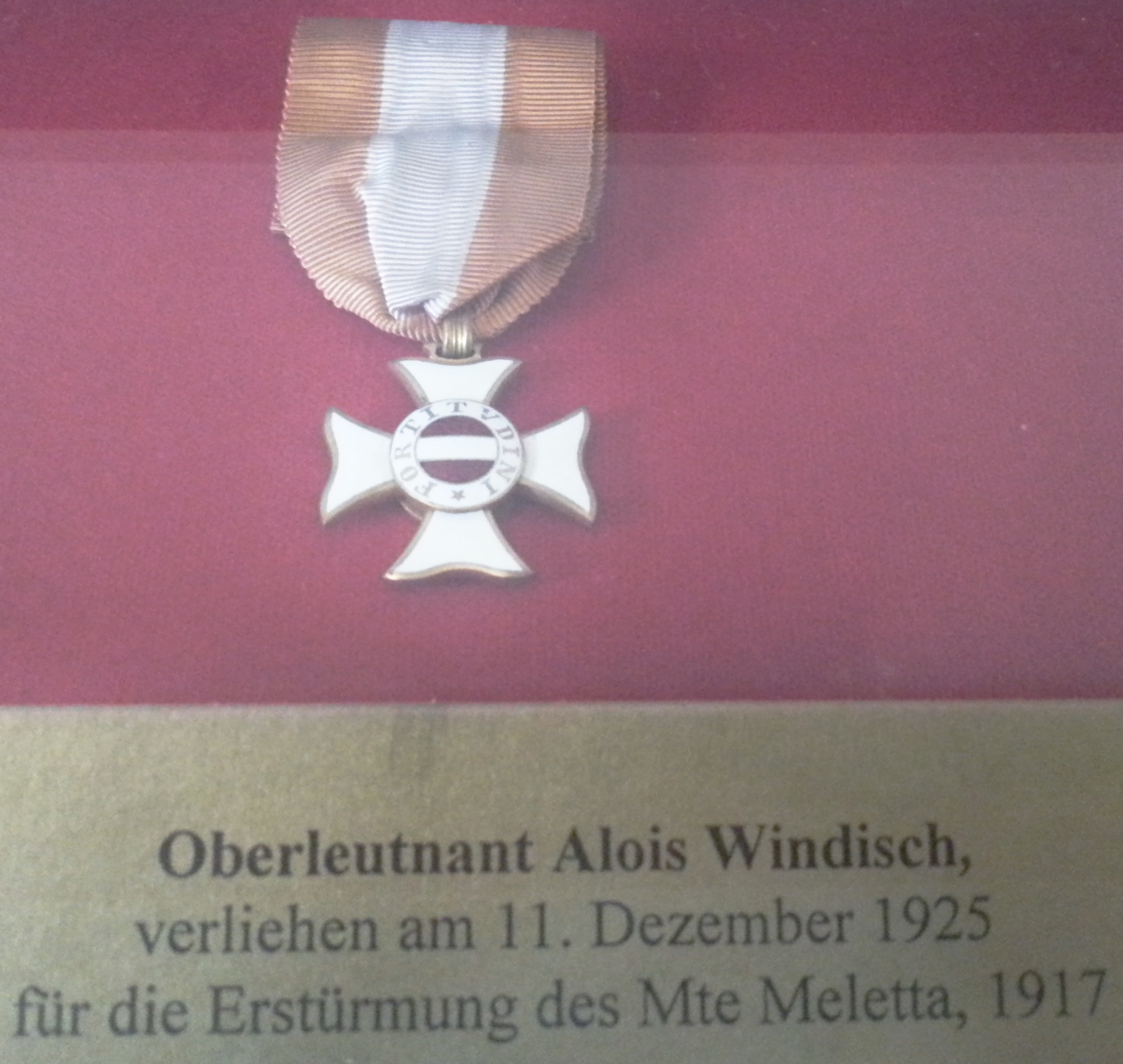
- Knight's Cross of the Military Order of Maria Theresa, awarded to Alois Windisch, now displayed at the Museum of Military History in Vienna
- Born: 3 February 1892; Fischau am Steinfeld, Lower Austria, Austria-Hungary
- Died: 28 December 1958 (aged 66); Wiener Neustadt, Republic of Austria
- Military career
- Allegiance: (Austria-Hungary) Austria–Hungary; Republic of German-Austria; (Austria) First Austrian Republic; Nazi Germany
- Branch: Austro-Hungarian Army; German-Austrian People's Militia; Bundesheer; Army (Wehrmacht)
- Service years: 1913–45
- Rank: Generalmajor
- Commands: 264th Infantry Division
- Conflicts: World War I; Annexation of the Sudetenland; World War II: Poland Campaign; Norwegian Campaign; Battles of Narvik; Operation Barbarossa; Operation Silberfuchs; Operation Platinfuchs
- Awards: Knight's Cross of the Iron Cross

Alois Joseph Windisch (3 February 1892 – 28 December 1958) was an Austrian officer, finally a Major General in the Wehrmacht of Nazi Germany during World War II. Along with Friedrich Franek, he was one of only two recipients of both the Knight's Cross of the Iron Cross and the Knight's Cross of the Military Order of Maria Theresa, the highest military honour of Austria-Hungary.

== Career ==
As a young officer in the Austro-Hungarian Army, Windisch served in World War I. Among other decorations, he was awarded the Knight's Cross of the Order of Maria Theresa (11 December 1925).

A first lieutenant in 1918, he remained in the Army of the newly founded Austrian Republic. Promoted to captain in 1921 (1 January 1921), he was selected for General Staff Training and graduated on top of his class. A full colonel in the Austrian General Staff since 1936 (promotion 24 June 1936) and senior tactics teacher, Windisch was well known for his refusal of the Nazi movement.

After the Nazi take over in Austria (13 March 1938), he was considered "politically unreliable", expelled from the General Staff Corps, put on administrative leave and earmarked for forced retirement. The beginning of World War II (1 September 1939) and the resulting need for experienced military leaders led to his assignment as commanding officer of a Mountain Infantry Regiment (Gebirgsjäger-Regiment 139). After the fall of Poland, he and his regiment took part in Operation Weserübung, the invasion of Norway.

Following the campaign, he was awarded the Knight's Cross of the Iron Cross.

Alois Windisch surrendered to the US Army in 1945 and was handed over to the Red Army, which extradited him to Yugoslavia. He was sentenced to 20 years imprisonment as a war criminal, but was released in 1952.

== Promotions ==
- 18 August 1913 Leutnant (2nd Lieutenant)
- 1 May 1915 Oberleutnant (1st Lieutenant)
- 15 June 1921 Hauptmann (Captain)
- 1 June 1924 Titular Stabshauptmann (Brevet Staff Captain or Captain 1st Class)
- 20 July 1928 Major
- 8 September 1932 Oberstleutnant (Lieutenant Colonel)
  - received Wehrmacht Rank Seniority (RDA) from 1 January 1938 (66d)
- 24 June 1936 Oberst (Colonel)

=== Wehrmacht ===
- 13 March 1938 Oberst (Colonel)
  - 27 August 1939 received Rank Seniority (RDA) from 1 August 1939 (37)
- 10 August 1943 Generalmajor (Major General) with effect and RDA from 1 September 1943

== Awards, decorations and honours ==
- Military Merit Cross (Austria-Hungary), 3rd Class with the War Decoration (ÖM3K)
  - When the "swords" were introduced to the war decoration on 13 December 1916, he was subsequently awarded this distinction (ÖM3KX).
- Hessian Bravery Medal (HT)
- Austro-Hungarian Military Merit Medal (Signum Laudis) in Bronze on the ribbon of the Military Merit Cross (ribbon for wartime merit)
  - When the "swords" were introduced on 13 December 1916, he was subsequently awarded this distinction.
- Austro-Hungarian Military Merit Medal (Signum Laudis) in Silver on the ribbon of the Military Merit Cross (ribbon for wartime merit)
  - When the "swords" were introduced on 13 December 1916, he was subsequently awarded this distinction.
- Karl Troop Cross
- Order of the Iron Crown, Knight III. Class with War Decoration and Swords (ÖEK3KX)
- Military Merit Cross (Austria-Hungary), 3rd Class with the War Decoration and Swords (ÖM3KX); 2nd time awarded
- Wound Medal (Austria-Hungary) with 3 stripes (Indicating 3 wounds)
  - after the Anschluss in 1938 exchanged for the German Wound Badge (1918) in Silver
- Military Order of Maria Theresa, Knight's Cross awarded retrospectively for his achievements on 4 December 1917 on the Dolomite front at Monte Tondarecar and Monte Miela between Primolano and Asiago
  - The confirmed eligibility was only granted on 11 December 1925 by the 192nd Chapter of the Military Order of Maria Theresa. Had this conferral occurred during the time of the Austro-Hungarian Monarchy, Windisch would have automatically received the Austrian title of nobility (von Windisch) and would also have been entitled to apply for elevation to the rank of Freiherr without paying the usual fees. However, this was not the case.
- Hungarian World War Commemorative Medal with Swords and Helmet
- Austrian War Memorial Medal with Swords
- Knight's Cross of the Austrian Order of Merit on 13 March 1935
- Military Merit Cross (Federal State of Austria), III. Class
- Wehrmacht Long Service Award, 4th to 1st Class (25-year Service Cross)
- Honour Cross of the World War 1914/1918 with Swords
- Sudetenland Medal
- Iron Cross (1939), 2nd and 1st Class
  - 2nd Class on 30 March 1940
  - 1st Class on 9 May 1940
- Knight's Cross of the Iron Cross on 20 June 1940 as Oberst and Commander of Gebirgsjäger-Regiment 139 for Operation Weserübung in Norway
- General Assault Badge in Silver
- Narvik Shield
- Finnish Order of the Cross of Liberty, 2nd Class with Swords on 12 December 1941
- Winter Battle in the East 1941–42 Medal
- Order of the Crown of King Zvonimir (Croatia)

=== Honours ===
- Alois Windisch Street in Bad Fischau-Brunn (the former Fischau am Steinfeld)
- The Windisch Barracks of the Jäger, since 2023 the Georg Goess Barracks, in Klagenfurt was named after him in 1967.

== Sources ==
- Fellgiebel, Walther-Peer (2000) [1986]. Die Träger des Ritterkreuzes des Eisernen Kreuzes 1939–1945 — Die Inhaber der höchsten Auszeichnung des Zweiten Weltkrieges aller Wehrmachtteile [The Bearers of the Knight's Cross of the Iron Cross 1939–1945 — The Owners of the Highest Award of the Second World War of all Wehrmacht Branches] (in German). Friedberg, Germany: Podzun-Pallas. ISBN 978-3-7909-0284-6.
- German Federal Archives (Military Section): BArch PERS 6/2064 and PERS 6/301354

Military offices
Preceded by Generalmajor Paul Hermann	Commander of 264. Infanterie-Division; 9 October 1944 - March 1945	Succeeded by Unknown
