= Szumleś Szlachecki =

- Village
- Location within Poland
- Coordinates: 54°8′25″N 18°16′11″E
- Country: Poland
- Voivodeship: Pomeranian
- County: Kościerzyna
- Gmina: Nowa Karczma
- Population (2022): 194

Szumleś Szlachecki (Polish pronunciation: [ˈʂumlɛɕ ʂlaˈxɛtskʲi]) is a village in the administrative district of Gmina Nowa Karczma, within Kościerzyna County, Pomeranian Voivodeship, in northern Poland.

For details of the history of the region, see History of Pomerania.
