= Stefanowo, Kościerzyna County =

Village in Kociewie

Stefanowo
- Village
- Location within Poland
- Coordinates: 54°3′34″N 18°17′10″E
- Country: Poland
- Voivodeship: Pomeranian
- County: Kościerzyna
- Gmina: Liniewo
- Population: 26

Stefanowo [stɛfaˈnɔvɔ] is a village in the administrative district of Gmina Liniewo, within Kościerzyna County, Pomeranian Voivodeship, in northern Poland.

For details of the history of the region, see History of Pomerania.
