= Stary Wiec =

Village in Kociewie

- Village
- Location within Poland
- Coordinates: 54°5′19″N 18°19′23″E
- Country: Poland
- Voivodeship: Pomeranian
- County: Kościerzyna
- Gmina: Liniewo
- Population: 96

Stary Wiec [ˈstarɨ ˈvjɛt͡s] is a village in the administrative district of Gmina Liniewo, within Kościerzyna County, Pomeranian Voivodeship, in northern Poland.

For details of the history of the region, see History of Pomerania.
