= Gmina Nowa Karczma =

Gmina Nowa Karczma Nowa Karczma Commune
- Gmina
- Coat of arms
- Interactive map of Gmina Nowa Karczma
- Coordinates (Nowa Karczma): 54°8′0″N 18°12′9″E
- Country: Poland
- Voivodeship: Pomeranian
- County: Kościerzyna
- Seat: Nowa Karczma

Area
  - Total: 113.33 km^{2} (43.76 sq mi)

Population (2022)
  - Total: 7,149
  - Density: 63.08/km^{2} (163.4/sq mi)
- Website: http://www.nowakarczma.pl

Gmina Nowa Karczma (Kashubian: Nowô Karczma) is a rural gmina (administrative district) in Kościerzyna County, Pomeranian Voivodeship, in northern Poland. Its seat is the village of Nowa Karczma, which lies approximately 15 kilometres (9 mi) east of Kościerzyna and 39 km (24 mi) south-west of the regional capital Gdańsk.

The gmina covers an area of 113.33 square kilometres (43.8 sq mi), and as of 2022 its total population is 7,149.

The gmina contains part of the protected area called Kashubian Landscape Park.

== Villages ==
Gmina Nowa Karczma contains the villages and settlements of Będomin, Grabówko, Grabowo Kościerskie, Grabowska Huta, Guzy, Horniki, Horniki Dolne, Horniki Górne, Jasionowa Huta, Jasiowa Huta, Kamionki, Liniewko Kościerskie, Lubań, Lubieszynek, Nowa Karczma, Nowe Horniki, Nowy Barkoczyn, Olszowy Kiesz, Rekownica, Skrzydłówko, Skrzydłowo, Śledziowa Huta, Stary Barkoczyn, Szatarpy, Szpon, Sztofrowa Huta, Szumleś Królewski, Szumleś Szlachecki, Wielki Kamień, Zielona Wieś and Zimne Zdroje.

== Neighbouring gminas ==
Gmina Nowa Karczma is bordered by the gminas of Kościerzyna, Liniewo, Przywidz, Skarszewy and Somonino.
