= Gmina Liniewo =

Gmina Liniewo Liniewo Commune
- Gmina
- Coat of arms
- Interactive map of Gmina Liniewo
- Coordinates (Liniewo): 54°4′33″N 18°13′37″E
- Country: Poland
- Voivodeship: Pomeranian
- County: Kościerzyna
- Seat: Liniewo

Area
  - Total: 110.07 km^{2} (42.50 sq mi)

Population (2022)
  - Total: 4,504
  - Density: 40.92/km^{2} (106.0/sq mi)
- Website: http://www.liniewo.pl

Gmina Liniewo is a rural gmina (administrative district) in Kościerzyna County, Pomeranian Voivodeship, in northern Poland. Its seat is the village of Liniewo, which lies approximately 17 kilometres (11 mi) east of Kościerzyna and 42 km (26 mi) south-west of the regional capital Gdańsk.

The gmina covers an area of 110.07 square kilometres (42.5 sq mi), and as of 2022 its total population is 4,504.

== Villages ==
Gmina Liniewo contains the villages and settlements of Brzęczek, Bukowe Pole, Chrósty Wysińskie, Chrztowo, Deka, Garczyn, Głodowo, Iłownica, Liniewo, Liniewskie Góry, Lubieszyn, Lubieszynek, Małe Liniewo, Mestwinowo, Milonki, Orle, Płachty, Równe, Rymanowiec, Sobącz, Stary Wiec, Stefanowo and Wysin.

== Neighbouring gminas ==
Gmina Liniewo is bordered by the gminas of Kościerzyna, Nowa Karczma, Skarszewy and Stara Kiszewa.
