= Płachty, Pomeranian Voivodeship =

Płachty
- Village
- Location within Poland
- Coordinates: 54°5′26″N 18°15′18″E
- Country: Poland
- Voivodeship: Pomeranian
- County: Kościerzyna
- Gmina: Liniewo
- Population: 95

Płachty [ˈpwaxtɨ] is a village in the administrative district of Gmina Liniewo, within Kościerzyna County, Pomeranian Voivodeship, in northern Poland.

For details of the history of the region, see History of Pomerania.
