= Wielki Kamień =

- Settlement
- Location within Poland
- Coordinates: 54°9′12″N 18°12′41″E
- Country: Poland
- Voivodeship: Pomeranian
- County: Kościerzyna
- Gmina: Nowa Karczma

Wielki Kamień (Polish pronunciation: [ˈvjɛlkʲi ˈkamjɛj̃]) is a settlement in the administrative district of Gmina Nowa Karczma, within Kościerzyna County, Pomeranian Voivodeship, in northern Poland.

For details of the history of the region, see History of Pomerania.
