= Kamionki, Pomeranian Voivodeship =

Kamionki
- Settlement
- Location within Poland
- Coordinates: 54°9′38″N 18°12′22″E
- Country: Poland
- Voivodeship: Pomeranian
- County: Kościerzyna
- Gmina: Nowa Karczma

Kamionki [kaˈmjɔnki] is a settlement in the administrative district of Gmina Nowa Karczma, within Kościerzyna County, Pomeranian Voivodeship, in northern Poland.

For details of the history of the region, see History of Pomerania.
