= Orle, Kościerzyna County =

Orle
- Village
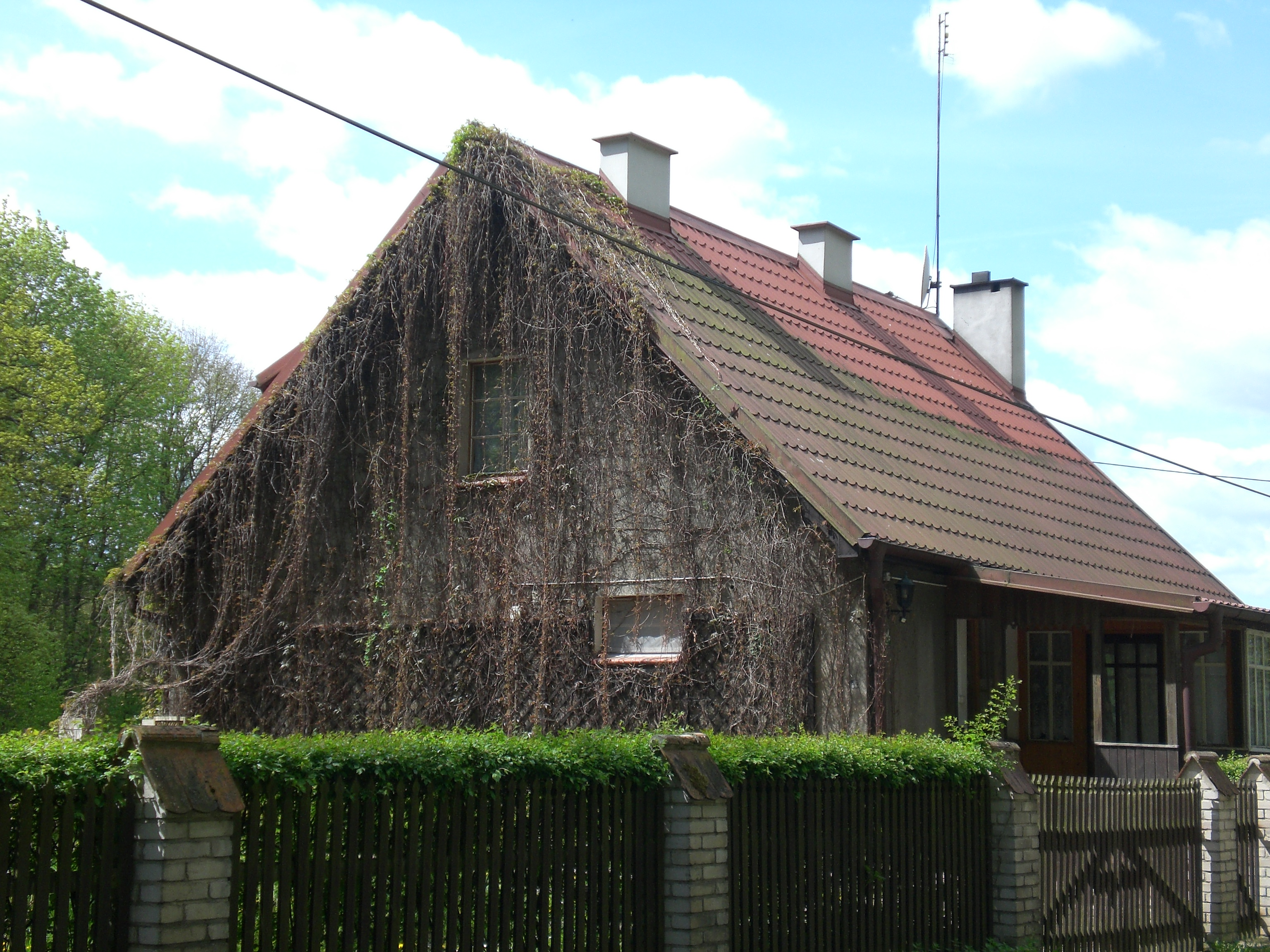
- Forester's lodge in Orle

- Location within Poland
- Coordinates: 54°3′14″N 18°12′41″E
- Country: Poland
- Voivodeship: Pomeranian
- County: Kościerzyna
- Gmina: Liniewo
- Population: 488
- Time zone: UTC+1 (CET)
  - Summer (DST): UTC+2 (CEST)
- Vehicle registration: GKS

Orle [ˈɔrlɛ] is a village in the administrative district of Gmina Liniewo, within Kościerzyna County, Pomeranian Voivodeship, in northern Poland. It is located in the historic region of Pomerania.

== History ==
During the German occupation of Poland (World War II), Orle was one of the sites of executions of Poles, carried out by the Germans in 1939 as part of the Intelligenzaktion, and Poles from Orle were also executed in the forest between Skarszewy and Więckowy.
