= Zimne Zdroje, Kościerzyna County =

Zimne Zdroje
- Settlement
- Location within Poland
- Coordinates: 54°7′20″N 18°14′24″E
- Country: Poland
- Voivodeship: Pomeranian
- County: Kościerzyna
- Gmina: Nowa Karczma
- Population (2022): 30
- Time zone: UTC+1 (CET)
  - Summer (DST): UTC+2 (CEST)

Zimne Zdroje [ˈʑimnɛ ˈzdrɔjɛ] is a settlement in the administrative district of Gmina Nowa Karczma, within Kościerzyna County, Pomeranian Voivodeship, in northern Poland. It is located in the ethnocultural region of Kashubia in the historic region of Pomerania.
