= 276th Volksgrenadier Division =

580th Volksgrenadier Division 276th Volksgrenadier Division
- 580. Volksgrenadier-Division; 276. Volksgrenadier-Division
- Active: 4 September 1944– March 1945
- Country: Nazi Germany
- Allegiance: Army
- Engagements: World War II

Commanders
- Notable commanders: Kurt Möhring; Hugo Dempwolff

The 276th Volksgrenadier Division, initially known as the 276th Infantry Division, was a volksgrenadier division of the German Army during World War II, active from 1944 to 1945.

== History ==
=== 276th Infantry Division ===
The 276th Infantry Division's creation was ordered on 22 May 1940 as a division of the tenth Aufstellungswelle by Wehrkreis XXI authorities. However, as the Battle of France ended much sooner than anticipated, the assembly was aborted on 22 July.

Instead, the 276th Infantry Division saw its actual deployment on 17 November 1943 in the south of German-occupied France as a division of the twenty-second Aufstellungswelle, using remnants of the 38th Infantry Division. On 16 June 1944, following the Allied landings in Normandy, the division was activated and sent to the front against the Western Allies. The division was assigned to XXXXVII Panzer Corps of Panzer Group West and inserted into the line south of Tilly. On 7 August, several Allied breakthroughs into the positions of the 276th and 236th Infantry Divisions west of Hamars forced a withdrawal. Subsequently, following the Allied breakthrough at Avranches, the 276th Infantry Division was trapped in the Falaise Pocket, where it was annihilated.

=== 580th & 276th Volksgrenadier Division ===
The division was formed in Poland on 4 September 1944, by redesignating the 580th Volksgrenadier Division, under the command of Kurt Möhring. It contained the 986th, 987th and 988th Grenadier Regiments, and the 276th Artillery Regiment. The 580th Volksgrenadier Division had been created only a week earlier in West Prussia from the meagre remains of the 276th Infantry Division and new recruits.

The 276th Volksgrenadier Division fought in the Battle of the Bulge, where it took over two thousand casualties, including General Möhring who was killed on 18 December 1944. Möhring was succeeded by Hugo Dempwolff. It then saw action in Luxembourg, and was destroyed fighting American forces in March 1945.
