= Równe, Pomeranian Voivodeship =

Równe
- Settlement
- Location within Poland
- Coordinates: 54°3′7″N 18°10′1″E
- Country: Poland
- Voivodeship: Pomeranian
- County: Kościerzyna
- Gmina: Liniewo
- First mentioned: 1289

Population
  - Total: 39
- Time zone: UTC+1 (CET)
  - Summer (DST): UTC+2 (CEST)
- Vehicle registration: GKS

Równe [ˈruvnɛ] is a settlement in the administrative district of Gmina Liniewo, within Kościerzyna County, Pomeranian Voivodeship, in northern Poland. It is located in the ethnocultural region of Kashubia in the historic region of Pomerania.

The oldest known mention of the village comes from 1289.

== Demographics ==
Historical population
Year	Pop.	±%
1869	97	—
1885	102	+5.2%
