= Milonki, Pomeranian Voivodeship =

Village in Kociewie

Milonki
- Village
- Location within Poland
- Coordinates: 54°2′45″N 18°16′53″E
- Country: Poland
- Voivodeship: Pomeranian
- County: Kościerzyna
- Gmina: Liniewo
- Population: 33

Milonki [miˈlɔŋki] is a village in the administrative district of Gmina Liniewo, within Kościerzyna County, Pomeranian Voivodeship, in northern Poland.

For details of the history of the region, see History of Pomerania.
