= Sobącz =

- Village
- Location within Poland
- Coordinates: 54°4′10″N 18°9′22″E
- Country: Poland
- Voivodeship: Pomeranian
- County: Kościerzyna
- Gmina: Liniewo
- Population: 234

Sobącz [ˈsɔbɔnt͡ʂ] is a village in the administrative district of Gmina Liniewo, within Kościerzyna County, Pomeranian Voivodeship, in northern Poland.

For details of the history of the region, see History of Pomerania.
