= Skrzydłowo, Pomeranian Voivodeship =

Skrzydłowo
- Village
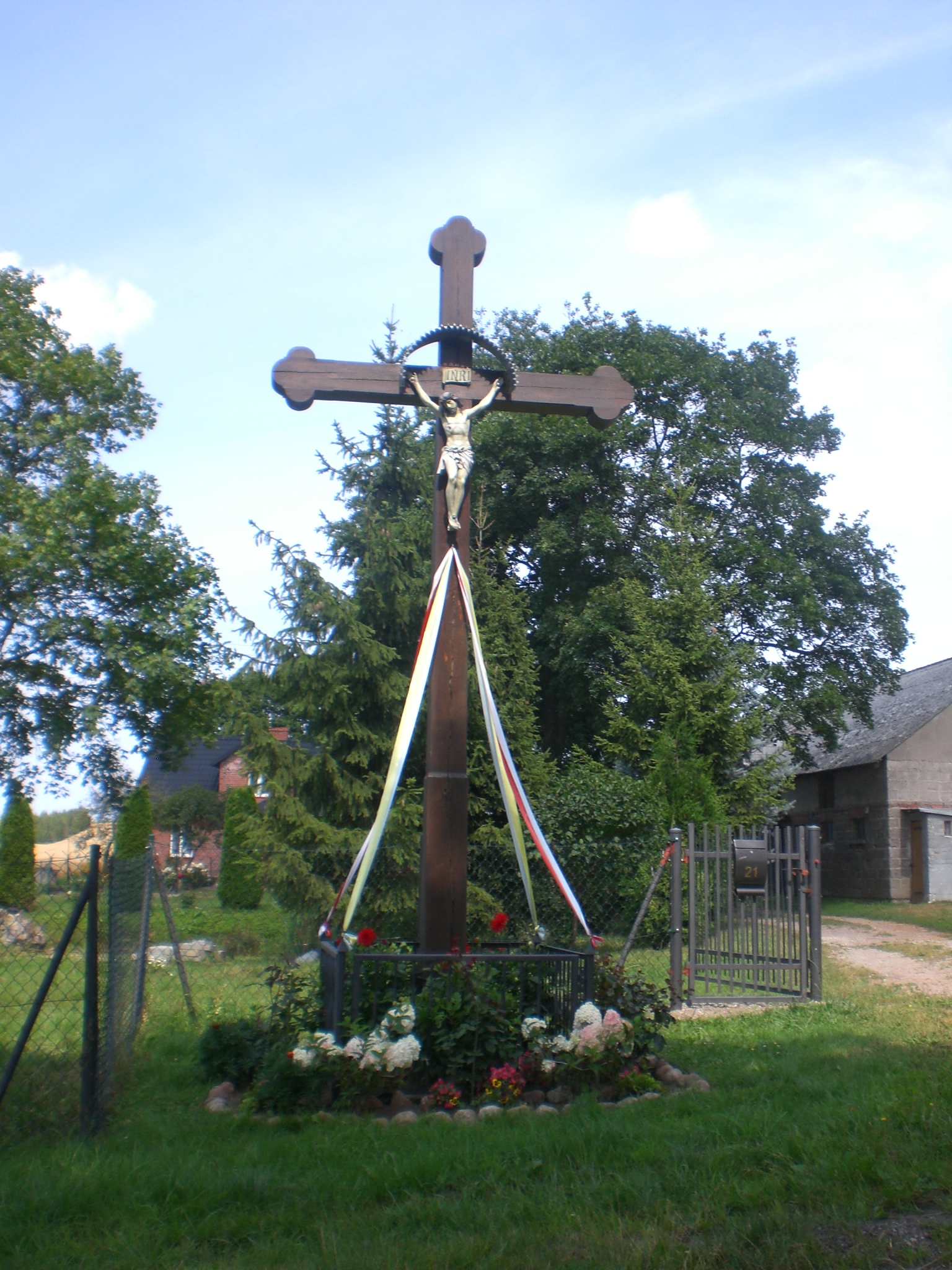
- Wayside cross in Skrzydłowo

- Location within Poland
- Coordinates: 54°7′36″N 18°15′14″E
- Country: Poland
- Voivodeship: Pomeranian
- County: Kościerzyna
- Gmina: Nowa Karczma
- Population (2022): 251
- Time zone: UTC+1 (CET)
  - Summer (DST): UTC+2 (CEST)
- Vehicle registration: GKS

Skrzydłowo [skʂɨˈdwɔvɔ] (Kashubian: Skrzidłowò) is a village in the administrative district of Gmina Nowa Karczma, within Kościerzyna County, Pomeranian Voivodeship, in northern Poland. It is located within the ethnocultural region of Kashubia in the historic region of Pomerania.

== History ==
The settlement dates back to prehistoric times and there is a cemetery from the Iron Age in the village, now an archaeological site.

Skrzydłowo was the site of an early medieval stronghold, which is also an archaeological site. It became part of the emerging Polish state under Poland's first historic ruler Mieszko I in the 10th century.

Within the Crown of the Kingdom of Poland, Skrzydłowo was a private church village of the Diocese of Włocławek, administratively located in the Tczew County in the Pomeranian Voivodeship.

During the German occupation of Poland (World War II), in 1939, Poles from Skrzydłowo were among the victims of massacres of Poles carried out by the Germans in the forest between Skarszewy and Więckowy as part of the Intelligenzaktion. In 1939, the Germans also carried out deportations to forced labour and expulsions of Poles from the village. Among the expellees were wives and children of men deported to forced labour. In January 1945, a German-perpetrated death march of Allied prisoners-of-war from the Stalag XX-B POW camp passed through the village.
