= Garczyn, Gmina Liniewo =

Village in Kociewie

Garczyn
- Village
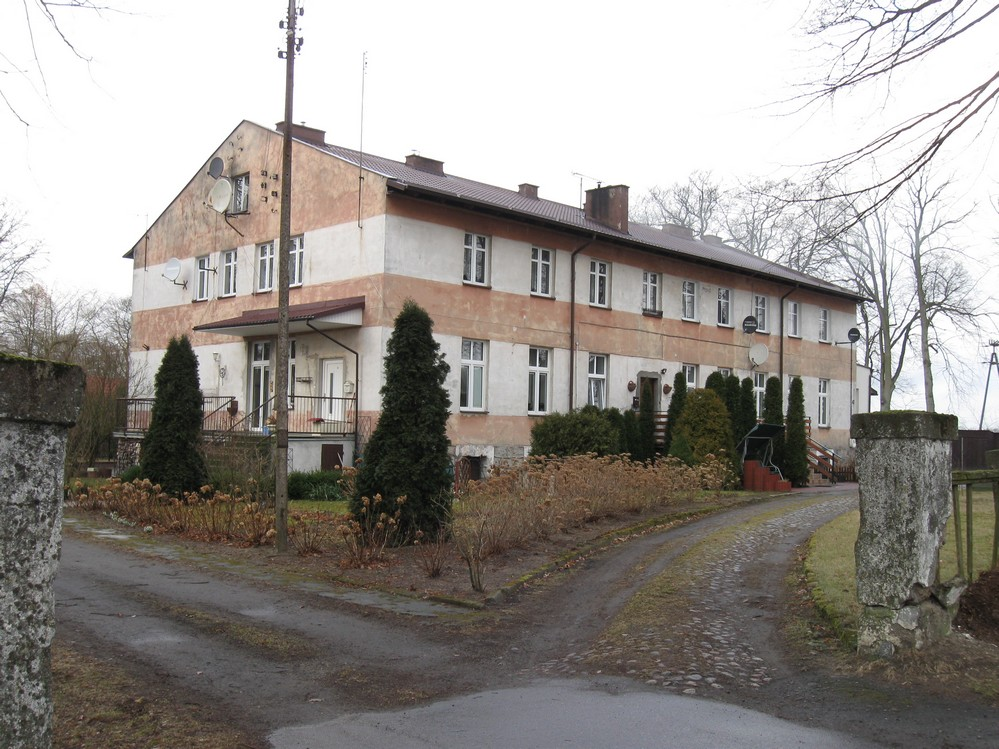

- Location within Poland
- Coordinates: 54°2′29″N 18°14′25″E
- Country: Poland
- Voivodeship: Pomeranian
- County: Kościerzyna
- Gmina: Liniewo
- Population: 251 (2,022)

Garczyn [ˈɡart͡ʂɨn] is a village in the administrative district of Gmina Liniewo, within Kościerzyna County, Pomeranian Voivodeship, in northern Poland.

For details of the history of the region, see History of Pomerania.
