= Lubieszyn, Pomeranian Voivodeship =

Lubieszyn
- Village
- Location within Poland
- Coordinates: 54°6′26″N 18°14′12″E
- Country: Poland
- Voivodeship: Pomeranian
- County: Kościerzyna
- Gmina: Liniewo
- Population: 253

Lubieszyn [luˈbjɛʂɨn] is a village in the administrative district of Gmina Liniewo, within Kościerzyna County, Pomeranian Voivodeship, in northern Poland.

For details of the history of the region, see History of Pomerania.

== Notable residents ==
- Kurt Möhring (1900–1944), Wehrmacht general
