= Iłownica, Pomeranian Voivodeship =

Village in Kociewie

Iłownica
- Village
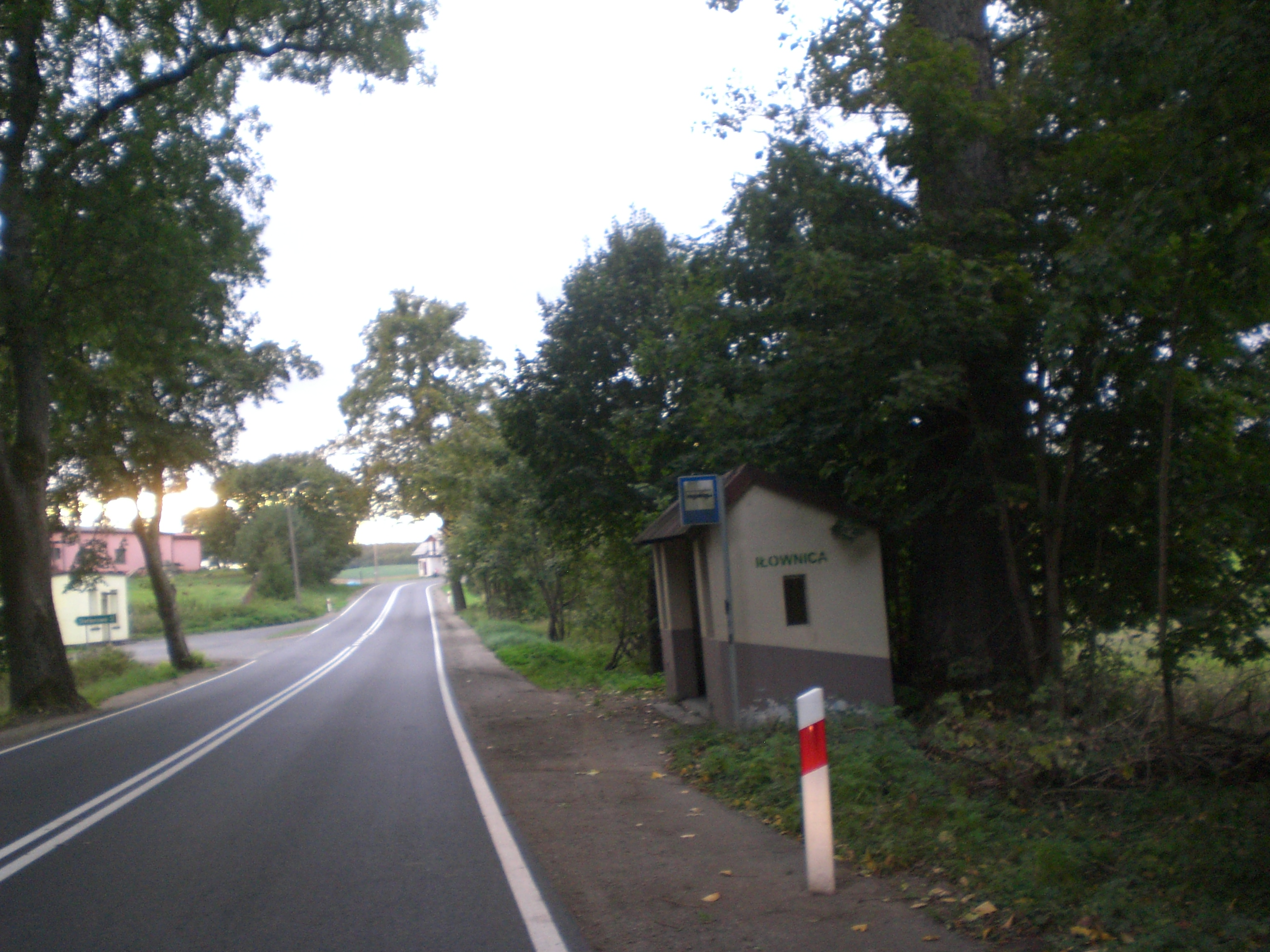
- A bus shelter in the village

- Location within Poland
- Coordinates: 54°4′47″N 18°16′58″E
- Country: Poland
- Voivodeship: Pomeranian
- County: Kościerzyna
- Gmina: Liniewo
- Population: 244

Iłownica [iwɔvˈnit͡sa] is a village in the administrative district of Gmina Liniewo, within Kościerzyna County, Pomeranian Voivodeship, in northern Poland.

For details of the history of the region, see History of Pomerania.
