= Wysin =

Village in Kociewie

- Village
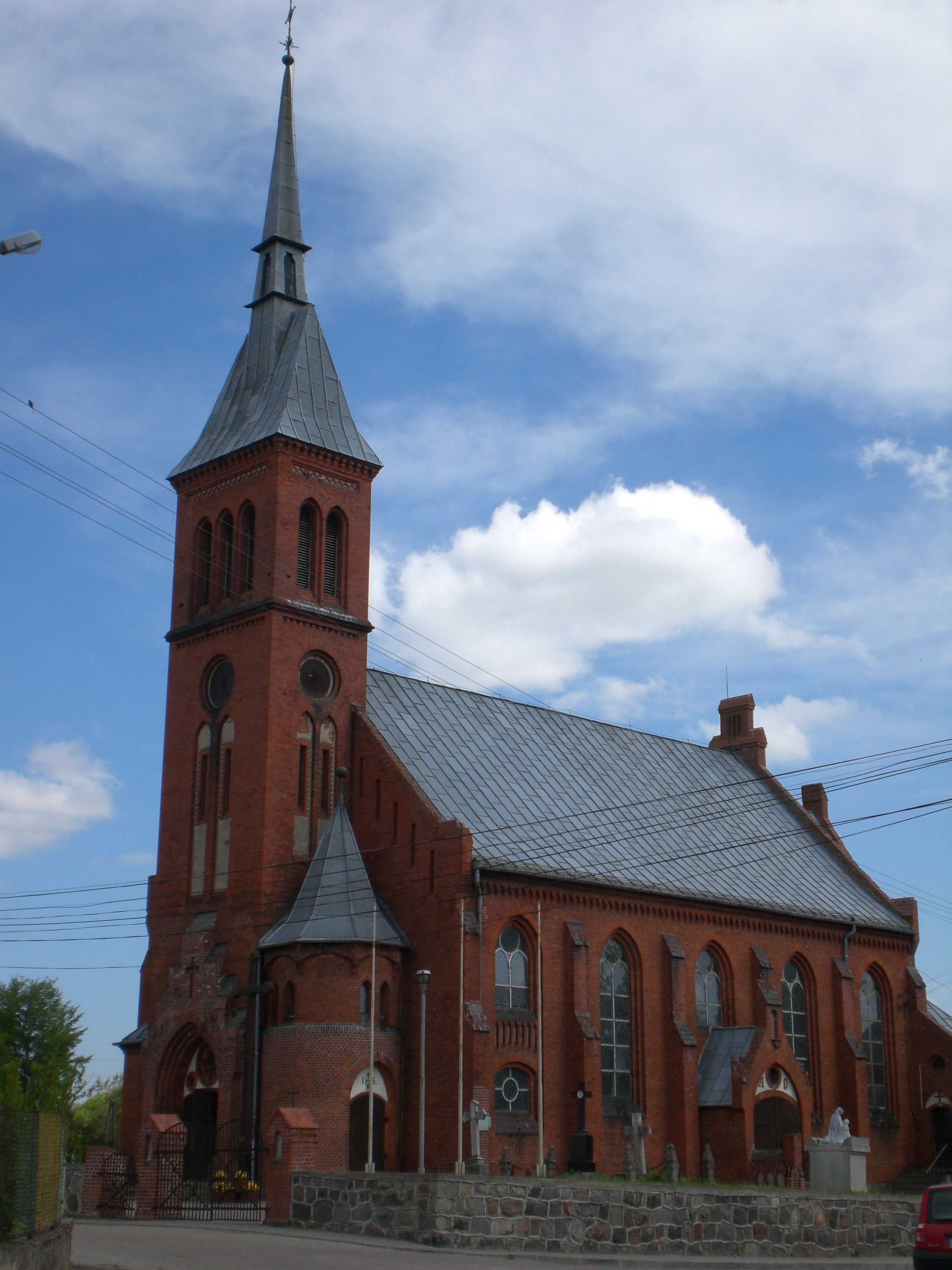
- All Saints church in Wysin

- Location within Poland
- Coordinates: 54°6′1″N 18°17′12″E
- Country: Poland
- Voivodeship: Pomeranian
- County: Kościerzyna
- Gmina: Liniewo
- Population: 548
- Time zone: UTC+1 (CET)
  - Summer (DST): UTC+2 (CEST)
- Vehicle registration: GKS

Wysin [ˈvɨɕin] is a village in the administrative district of Gmina Liniewo, within Kościerzyna County, Pomeranian Voivodeship, in northern Poland. It is located within the historic region of Pomerania.

== History ==
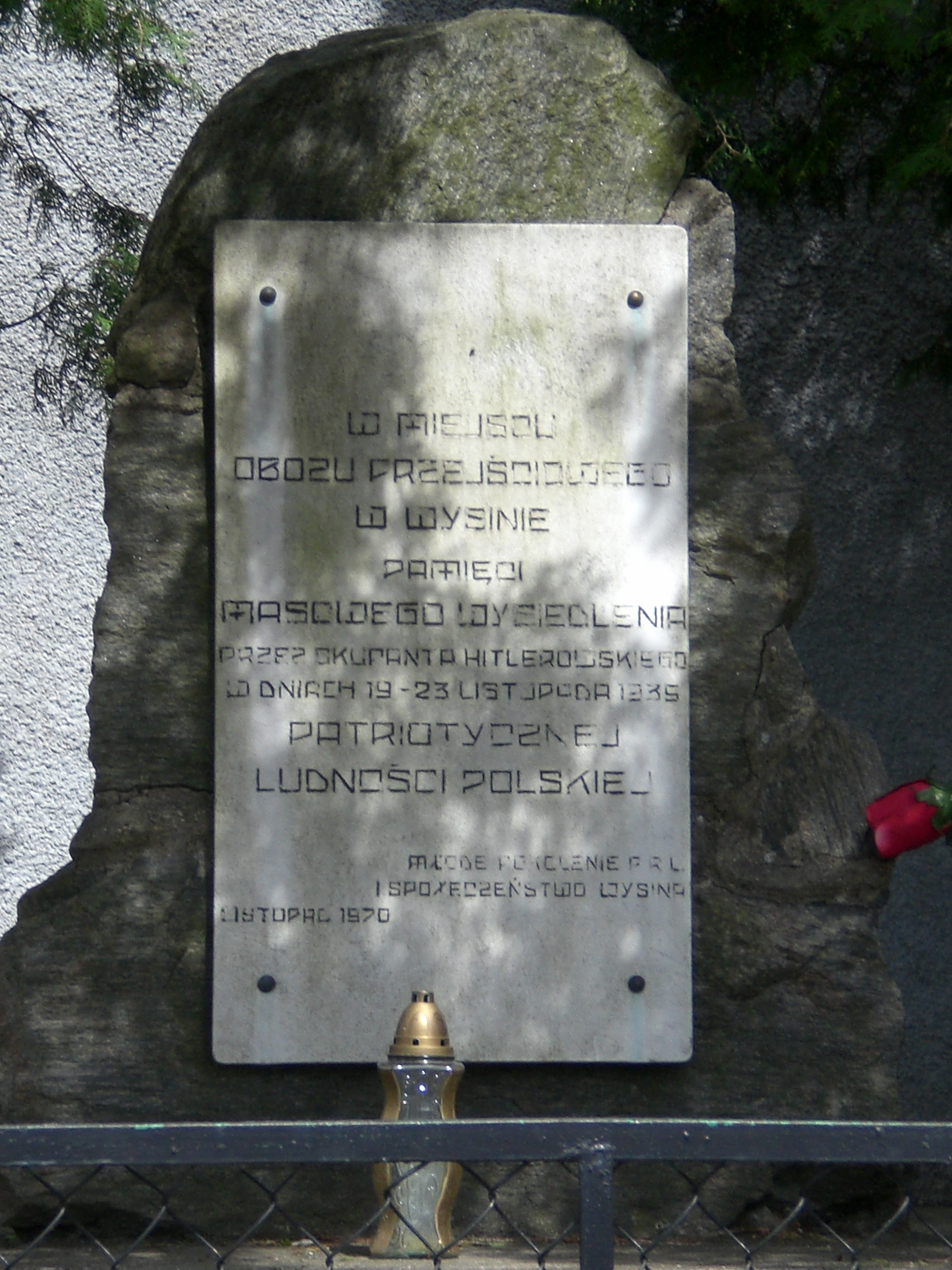
Memorial plaque at the former Nazi German transit camp for Poles

Human settlement dates back to prehistoric times. There are two archaeological sites from the Iron Age: a cemetery in the village, and a former settlement near the village.

Wysin was a private church village of the Diocese of Włocławek, administratively located in the Tczew County in the Pomeranian Voivodeship of the Polish Crown.

During the German occupation of Poland (World War II), in 1939, Wysin was one of the sites of executions of Poles, carried out by the Germans as part of the Intelligenzaktion, and Poles from Wysin were also executed in the forest between Skarszewy and Więckowy. The Germans also expelled the majority of the local Polish population, and established a transit camp for Poles expelled from the region in Wysin. In the camp, the Germans segregated the expellees, who were then either deported in freight trains to the General Government (German-occupied central Poland) or sent as forced labour to Germany or to new German colonists in the region.

== Education ==
The J. Sobisz Primary School (Szkoła Podstawowa im.Ks.J.Sobisza) is located in Wysin.
