= Wda =

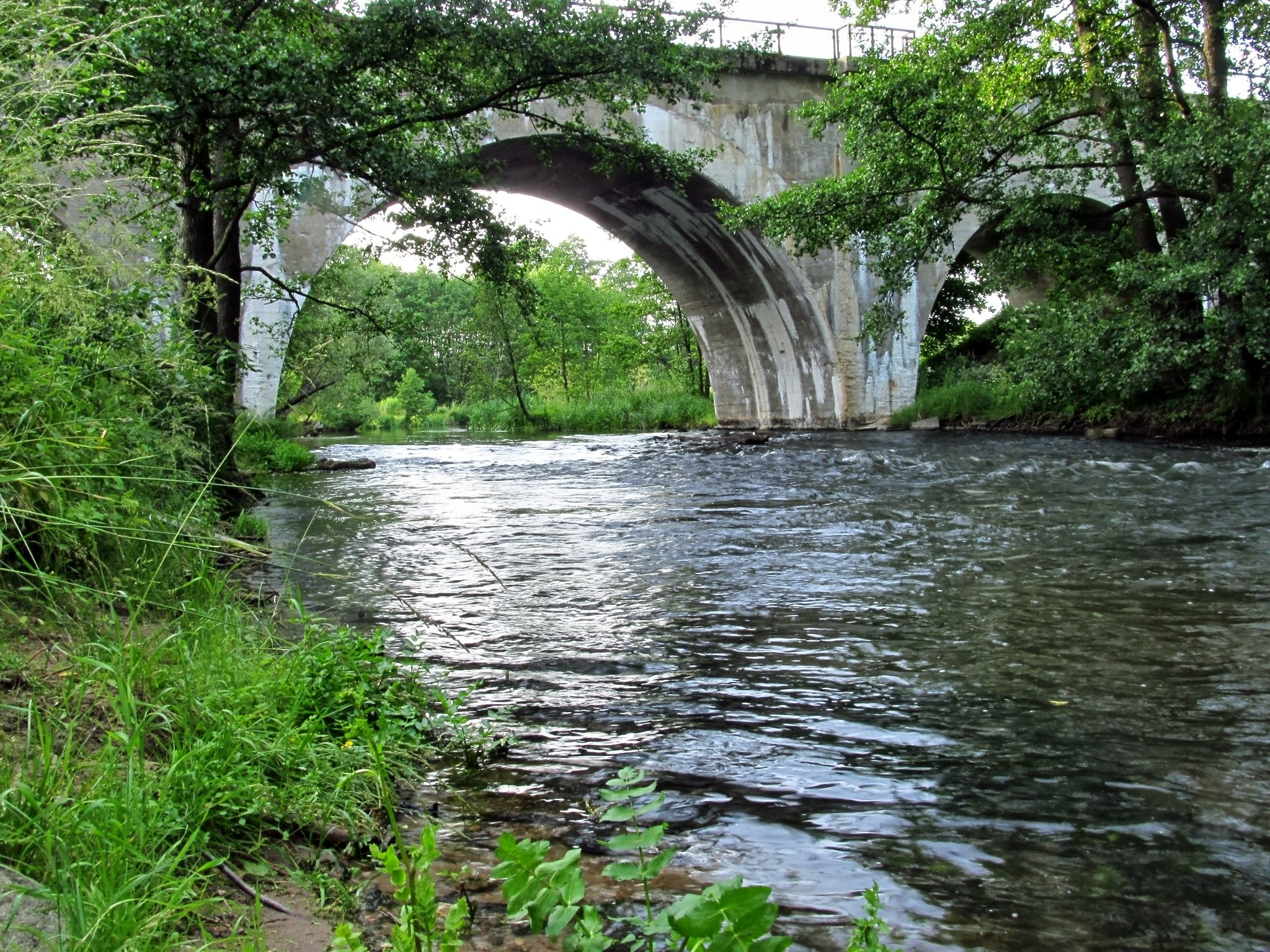

Location
- Country: Poland

Physical characteristics
- Mouth
  - location: Vistula
  - coordinates: 53.4117°N 18.4792°E
- Length: 198 km (123 mi)
- Basin size: 2,325 km^{2} (898 sq mi)
- Discharge
  - average: 6.52 m^{3}/s (230 cu ft/s)

Basin features
- Progression: Vistula→ Baltic Sea

The Wda (German: Schwarzwasser) is a river in Poland; it has a lowland character. The Wda is one of the 15 main canoe trails in Poland. It is 198 km long and the surface of its catchment area amounts to 2325 km^{2}. The Wda's average gradient is 0.7‰ and its flow is 6.52 m^{3}/s.

The Wda begins its course at Krążno Lake and ends in the Wisła in Świecie. The Wda is one of the longest rivers in Bory Tucholskie and one of the most important of Pomorze's river routes.

== Geography ==
The source of Wda is on Równina Charzykowska in Krężno Lake. The river flows through the area of Bory Tucholskie, Wdzydzki Landscape Park and Wdecki Landscape Park.

There is one river's canal below Wdzydze Lake. The river reaches Tleń, then flows across Wysoczyzna Świecka and ends in Wisła in Świecie on Dolina Fordońska.

== Lakes ==
- Krężno
- Wieckie
- Lubiszewskie
- Schodno
- Radolne
- Wdzydze
- Żurskie

The Wdzydze Lake along with lakes Gołyń, Jeleń and Słupinek are called Morze Kaszubskie. This lakes take a shape of the cross made of postglacial channels. Wdzydze Lake is dangerous for inexperienced canoeists during strong winds.

== Settlements ==
- Lipusz
- Borsk
- Wojtal
- Czarna Woda
- Błędno
- Tleń
- Świecie

== Flora and fauna ==
The Wda runs through many multispecies deciduous forests, in which contains diverse lichens. The river meanders also through riparian and alder forests. Rare mountain ash brekinii can be found in the Zygmunt Czubiński Reserve “Brzęki” in Szczerkowo. Next rare and protected plants on Wda's route are: lycopodium clavatum, diphasiastrum complanatum, lycopodium annotinum, sundew, western marsh orchid, heath spotted orchid, lesser butterfly-orchid, broad-leaved helleborine, european common twayblade and arctostaphylos uva-ursi, which are found in Wdecki Landscape Park. This region of Poland houses species like: cranes, common goldeneyes, goosanders, western marsh harriers, ruffs, kingfishers, trouts, common vipers, fire salamanders, tree frogs and great crested newts.

== History ==
The name “Wda” has been already used in the Middle Ages, but the river is also known as Czarna Woda. This name comes from dark brown colour of water caused by marshy banks, mineral molecules in water and sludge from tar factories in the 19th century. After World War I tourism started developing on Wda and about 40 years later Wda earned its title of The Queen of The Rivers of Kociew and The Beauty of The Land of Kociew.

== Hydroelectric power stations ==
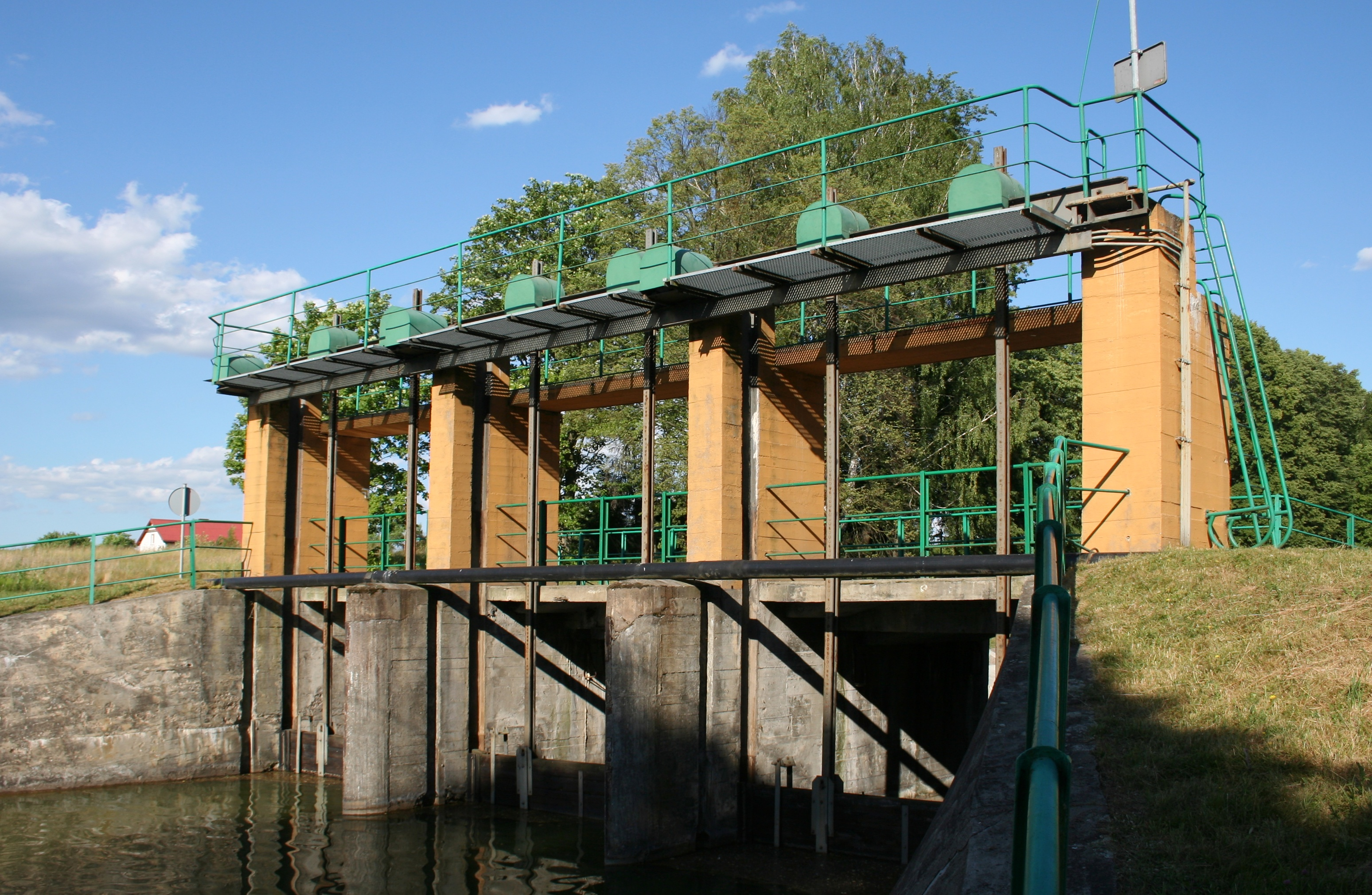
Hydroelectric dam in Żur

On the Wda's route are three hydroelectric power stations located in Żur, Gródek, and Kozłowo. In this area canoeists need to portage their canoes to the further part of the river.

== Attractions ==
Along the route of Wda some attractions can be found. First of them is a 19th-century neo-Gothic church in Lipusz. Next Kaszubski Park Etnograficzny, containing wooden dwelling houses, farms and windmills. The oldest ones date back to the 17th century. The archaeological reserve Kamienne Kręgi near the towns of Odry and Miedzno consists of 12 mysterious stone circles and 20 burial mounds, which are remains from Goths and Gepids. Błędno has a memorial for the victory of Polish and Soviet guerrilla fighters over the German army (27 X 1944). Next monument on Wda's route is a castle of the Teutonic Knights in Świecie. This is a building surrounded by water. From two sides by Wda and Wisła, and from the third side by the moat. There are also remains of defensive walls in the Old Town of Świecie and monumental Gothic parish church.

== See also ==
- Rivers of Poland
