= Wdzydze =

Wdzydze may refer to the following places in Poland:

- Wdzydze Lake
- Wdzydze Kiszewskie
- Wdzydze Tucholskie

== See also ==
- Olpuch Wdzydze railway station, railway station in Olpuch
