= Joniny (disambiguation) =

Joniny may refer to the following places in Poland:

- Joniny, Lesser Poland Voivodeship
- Joniny Małe, Pomeranian Voivodeship
- Joniny Wielkie, Pomeranian Voivodeship
