= Mniszek =

Mniszek may refer to:

== People ==
- Adam Mniszek (1889–1957), lieutenant colonel in the cavalry of the Polish Army
- Helena Mniszek (1878–1943), Polish writer

== Places ==
- Mniszek, Kuyavian-Pomeranian Voivodeship (north-central Poland)
- Mniszek, Lublin Voivodeship (east Poland)
- Mniszek, Masovian Voivodeship (east-central Poland)
- Mniszek, Pomeranian Voivodeship (north Poland)
- Mniszek, Świętokrzyskie Voivodeship (south-central Poland)

== See also ==
- Mniszech family, a Polish noble family
- Mniszech coat of arms
