= Kliczkowy =

- Village
- Location within Poland
- Coordinates: 53°56′24″N 17°53′39″E
- Country: Poland
- Voivodeship: Pomeranian
- County: Kościerzyna
- Gmina: Karsin
- Population: 117

Kliczkowy [klit͡ʂˈkɔvɨ] is a village in the administrative district of Gmina Karsin, within Kościerzyna County, Pomeranian Voivodeship, in northern Poland. It lies approximately 5 km (3 mi) north-west of Karsin, 21 km (13 mi) south of Kościerzyna, and 68 km (42 mi) south-west of the regional capital Gdańsk.

For details of the history of the region, see History of Pomerania.
