= Olpuch railway station =

Railway station in Olpuch, Poland

Coordinates: 54.0083°N 18.0214°E

Olpuch
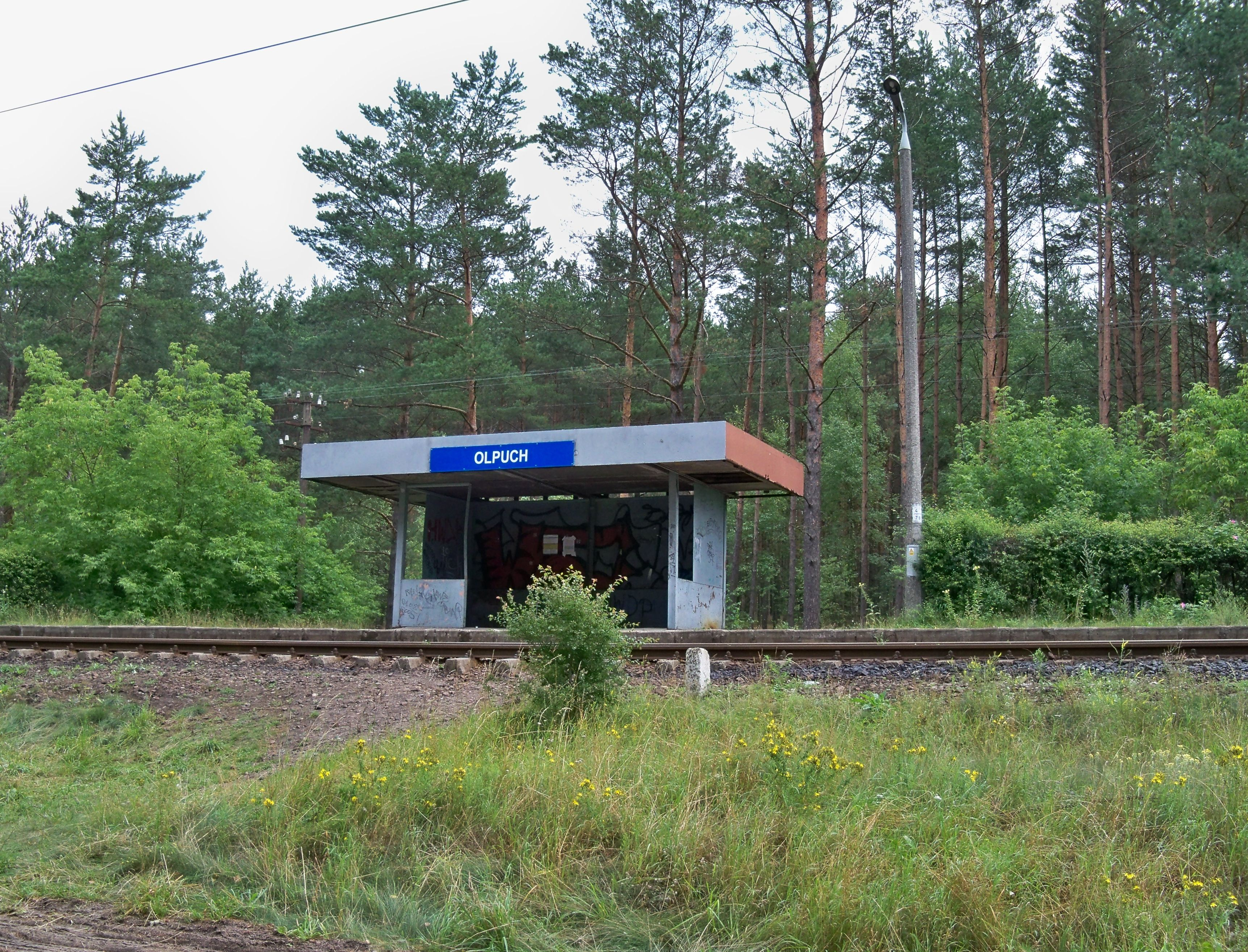

General information
- Location: Olpuch; Poland
- Owner: Polskie Koleje Państwowe S.A.
- Platforms: 1

Construction
- Structure type: Building: Never existed Depot: Never existed Water tower: Never existed

History
- Former names: Sandsee
Location
- Location within Pomeranian Voivodeship Location within Poland

Olpuch is a disused PKP railway station in Olpuch (Pomeranian Voivodeship), Poland.

== Lines crossing the station ==
Start station	End station	Line type
Nowa Wieś Wielka	Gdynia Port Centralny	Passenger/Freight
