= Polish long-distance Finswimming Championships 2020 =

Polish Finswimming Championships in long-distance 2020
- Host city: Wdzydze Kiszewskie
- Date: 6 September 2020

The 2020 Polish Finswimming Championships in long-distance - a finswimming competition held on September 6, 2020 in Wdzydze. Athletes competed in two events in each age category and in one relay also in each age category. They were swimming in Wdzydze Lake. Due to the low temperature of the lake, which was about 17 °C, it was decided to shorten the distances of the competition by half.

== Medalists of Polish Championships ==
=== Category A ===
==== Men ====
Competition	Gold	Silver	Bronze
Bi-fins
1600 meters	Szymon Kropidłowski UKS Manta Kościerzyna	Kacper Jurczak OSN Amfiprion Olecko	Tomasz Bicki UKS Manta Kościerzyna
Surface
1600 meters	Michał Dramiński OSN Amfiprion Olecko	Bartosz Smaruj UKS Delfinek Chodzież	(wystartowało jedynie dwóch zawodników)

==== Women ====
Competition	Gold	Silver	Bronze
Bi-fins
1600 meters	Kinga Chodyna OSN Amfiprion Olecko	Maja Czarnolewska UKS Delfinek Chodzież	Anna Czarnolewska UKS Delfinek Chodzież
Surface
1600 meters	Katarzyna Truszczyńska-Gzyl UKS Tri-Sea Mewa Władysławowo	Aleksandra Kaszkiel OSN Amfiprion Olecko	(wystartowały jedynie dwie zawodniczki)

==== Relays MIX ====
Competition	Gold	Silver	Bronze
Bi-fins
4×400 meters	OSN Amfiprion Olecko Aleksandra Kaszkiel Michał Dramiński Kacper Jurczak Kinga Chodyna	UKS Manta Kościerzyna Olga Guzińska Julia Greń Michał Koliński Szymon Kropidłowski	UKS Delfinek Chodzież Bartosz Smaruj Maja Czarnolewska Anna Czarnolewska Radosław Grabowski

=== Category B ===
==== Boys ====
Konkurencja	Gold	Silver	Bronze
Bi-fins
1600 metrów	Michał Koliński UKS Manta Kościerzyna	Ryszard Dulniak Active Divers Warszawa	Jakub Chmurzyński UKS Wodniacy Garczyn
Surface
1600 meters	(nobody started on that distance)		

==== Girls ====
Competition	Gold	Silver	Bronze
Bi-fins
1600 meters	Julia Greń UKS Manta Kościerzyna	Zuzanna Stachurska UKS Delfin Jastarnia	(wystartowało jedynie dwóch zawodników)
Surface
1600 meters	(Nobody started on that distance)		

==== Relays MIX ====
Competition	Gold	Silver	Bronze
Bi-fins
4×400 meters	UKS Delfin Jastarnia Zuzanna Stachurska Iga Narkowicz Oskar Margol Szymon Rzepko	(Only one relay started)	

=== Category C ===
==== Boys ====
Competition	Gold	Silver	Bronze
Bi-fins
1200 meters	Oskar Margol UKS Delfin Jastarnia	Radosław Grabowski UKS Delfinek Chodzież	Szymon Kreft Delfin Władysławowo
Surface
1200 metres	Kamil Pietras UKS Delfinek Chodzież	Dawid Stefanowski UKS Manta Kościerzyna	(wystartowało jedynie dwóch zawodników)

==== Girls ====
Competition	Gold	Silver	Bronze
Bi-fins
1200 meters	Karolina Szalast UKS Tri-Team Rumia	Gabriela Biszewska OSN Amfiprion Olecko	Maria Schutz UKS Wodniacy Garczyn
Surface
1200 meters	Olga Guzińska UKS Manta Kościerzyna	Michalina Pietraszak UKS Delfinek Chodzież	(wystartowały jedynie dwie zawodniczki)

==== Relays MIX ====
Competition	Gold	Silver	Bronze
Bi-fins
4×400 meters	UKS Delfinek Chodzież Aleksander Sporysz Michalina Pietraszak Nikola Nowakowska Kamil Pietras	(Only one relay started)	

=== Category D ===
==== Boys ====
Competition	Gold	Silver	Bronze
Bi-fins
800 meters	Karol Markiewicz UKS Tri-Sea Mewa Władysławowo	Marcin Humerczyk UKS Delfinek Chodzież	Wojciech Rzepko UKS Delfin Jastarnia
Surface
800 metres	Hubert Ciamciak UKS Delfinek Chodzież	(Only one person started)	

==== Girls ====
Competition	Gold	Silver	Bronze
Bi-fins
800 meters	Olga Strzępka UKS Delfinek Chodzież	Natalia Gembiak UKS Delfinek Chodzież	Nina Tartanus UKS Tri-Sea Mewa Władysławowo
Surface
800 meters	Nikola Nowakowska UKS Delfinek Chodzież	Hanna Isakowicz UKS Delfin Jastarnia	Anna Tarnowska UKS Wodniacy Garczyn

==== Relays MIX ====
Competition	Gold	Silver	Bronze
Bi-fins
4×400 meters	UKS Delfinek Chodzież Marcin Humerczyk Natalia Gembiak Hubert Ciamciak Olga Strzępka	UKS Delfin Jastarnia Hanna Isakowicz Alicja Turzyńska Wojciech Rzepko Kacper Margol	(Only two relays started)

==== Boys ====
Competition	Gold	Silver	Bronze
Bi-fins
400 meters	Albert Konkel UKS Tri-Sea Mewa Władysławowo	Dawid Kropidłowski UKS Manta Kościerzyna	Jan Wysiecki UKS Manta Kościerzyna
Surface
400 meters	Kacper Rozgoński UKS Manta Kościerzyna	Mateusz Studziński UKS Wodniacy Garczyn	Szymon Kropidłowski UKS Manta Kościerzyna

==== Girls ====
Competition	Gold	Silver	Bronze
Bi-fins
400 meters	Dagmara Cieszyńska UKS Manta Kościerzyna	Alicja Kreft Delfin Władysławowo	Lena Chmielewska UKS Manta Kościerzyna
Surface
400 meters	Lidia Panuszko OSN Amfiprion Olecko	Wiktoria Lellek UKS Wodniacy Garczyn	Monika Zarach UKS Wodniacy Garczyn

==== Relays MIX ====
Competition	Gold	Silver	Bronze
Bi-fins
4×400 meters	UKS Manta Kościerzyna Lena Chmielewska Dagmara Cieszyńska Jan Wysiecki Dawid Kropidłowski	(only one relay started)	
