= Karsin railway station =

Railway station in Karsin, Poland

Coordinates: 53°53′46″N 17°55′52″E

Karsin
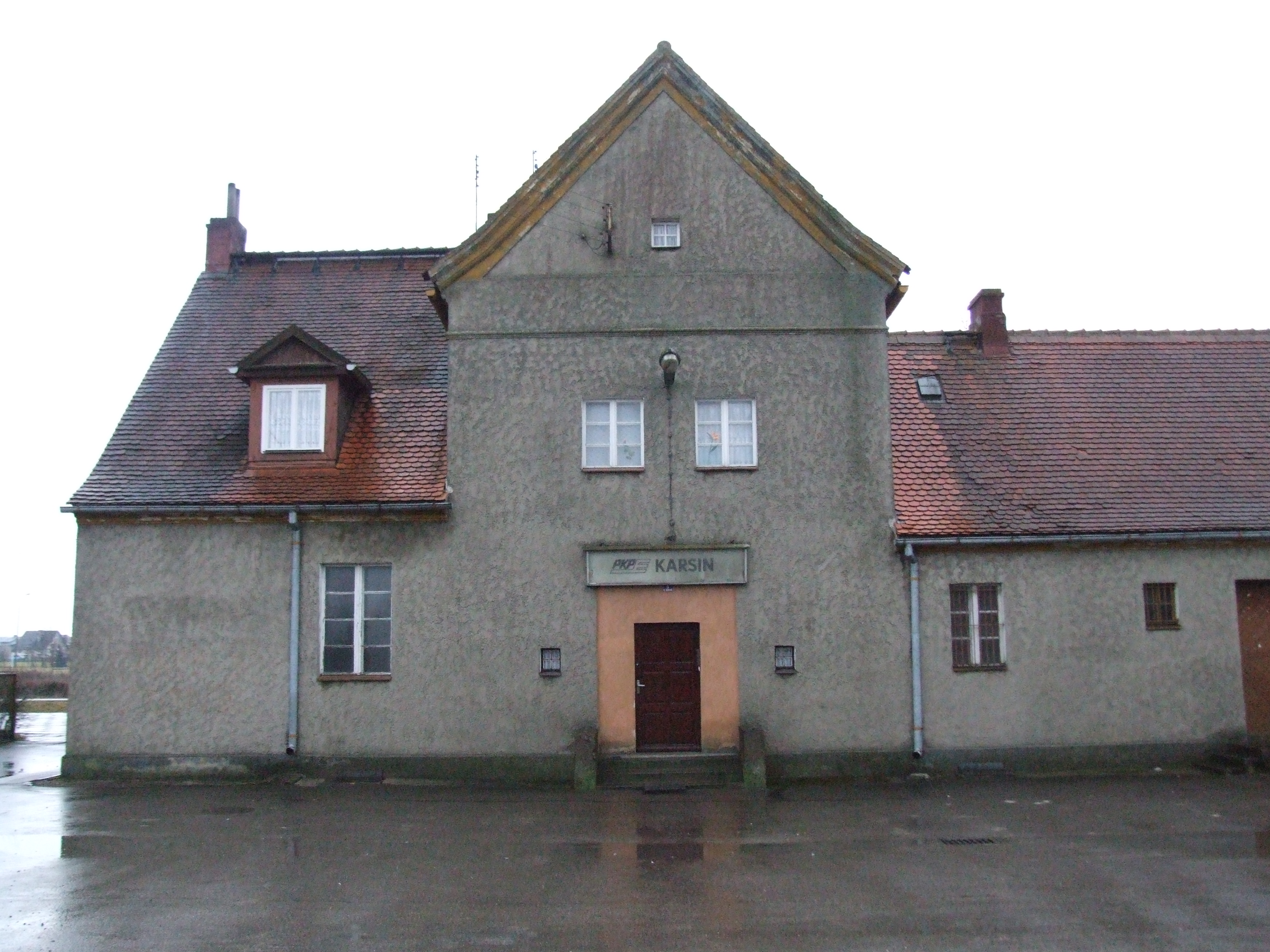

General information
- Location: Karsin; Poland
- Owner: Polskie Koleje Państwowe S.A.
- Platforms: No info

Construction
- Structure type: Building: Yes (no longer used); Depot: Never existed Water tower: Never existed
Location

Karsin is a former PKP railway station in Karsin (Pomeranian Voivodeship), Poland.

== Lines crossing the station ==
Start station	End station	Line type
Laskowice Pomorskie	Bąk	Passenger/Freight
