= Knieja, Kościerzyna County =

Knieja
- Settlement
- Location within Poland
- Coordinates: 53°57′3″N 17°53′29″E
- Country: Poland
- Voivodeship: Pomeranian
- County: Kościerzyna
- Gmina: Karsin
- Population: 12

Knieja [ˈkɲɛja] is a settlement in the administrative district of Gmina Karsin, within Kościerzyna County, Pomeranian Voivodeship, in northern Poland.

For details of the history of the region, see History of Pomerania.
