= Cisewie =

- Village
- Location within Poland
- Coordinates: 53°54′38″N 17°56′35″E
- Country: Poland
- Voivodeship: Pomeranian
- County: Kościerzyna
- Gmina: Karsin
- Population: 328

Cisewie [t͡ɕiˈsɛvjɛ] is a village in the administrative district of Gmina Karsin, within Kościerzyna County, Pomeranian Voivodeship, in northern Poland.

For details of the history of the region, see History of Pomerania.
