= Bąk, Gmina Karsin =

Village in Kashubia

Bąk
- Village
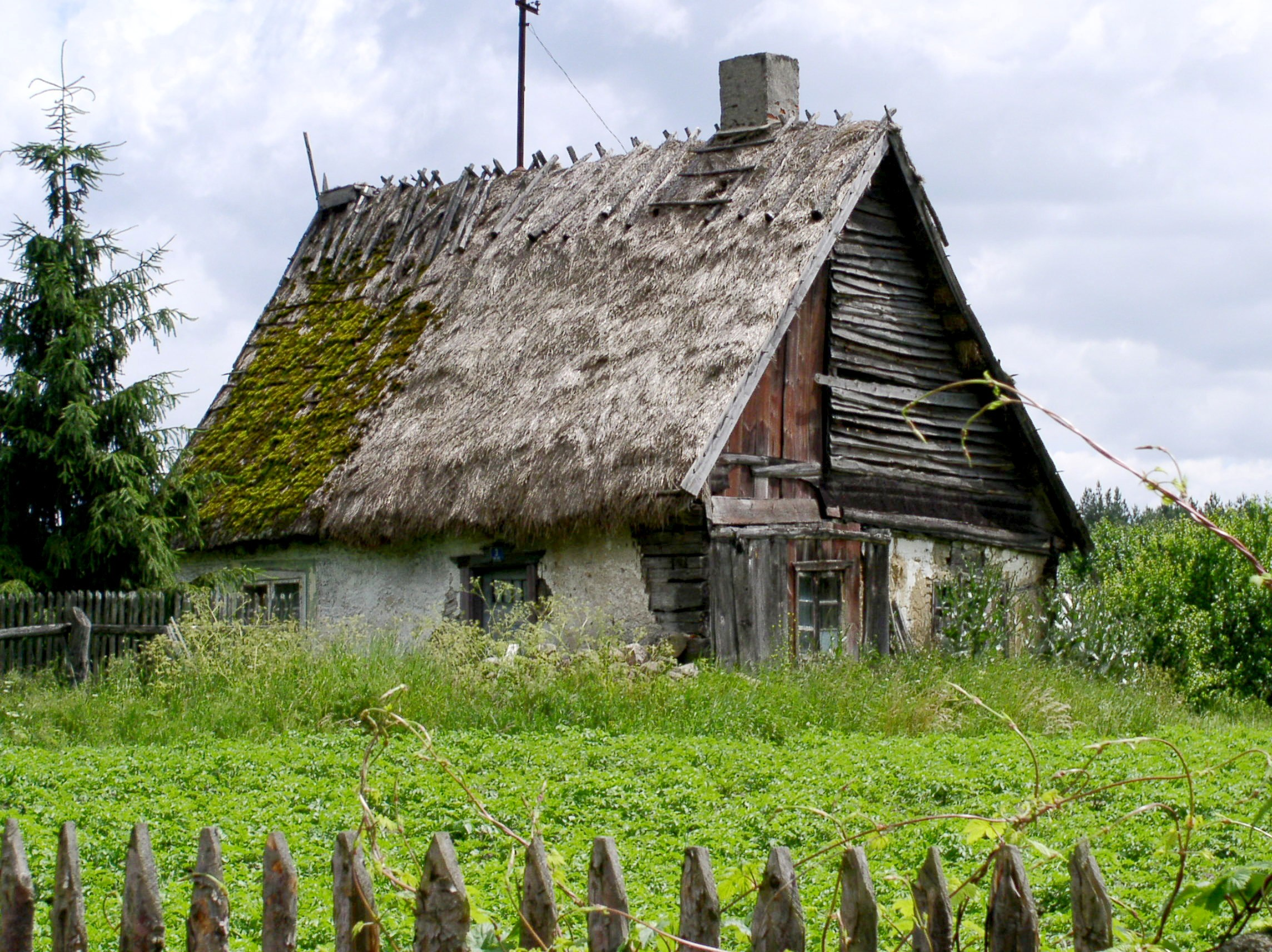

- Location within Poland
- Coordinates: 53°55′16″N 17°57′31″E
- Country: Poland
- Voivodeship: Pomeranian
- County: Kościerzyna
- Gmina: Karsin
- Population: 213

Bąk [bɔnk] is a village in the administrative district of Gmina Karsin, within Kościerzyna County, Pomeranian Voivodeship, in northern Poland.

For details of the history of the region, see History of Pomerania.
