= Żebrowo =

Żebrowo Żebrowò
- Hamlet
- Location within Poland
- Coordinates: 53°55′N 17°56′E
- Country: Poland
- Voivodeship: Pomeranian
- County: Kościerzyna
- Gmina: Karsin
- Population: 8

Żebrowo [ʐɛˈbrɔvɔ] (Kashubian: Żebrowò) is a hamlet in the administrative district of Gmina Karsin, within Kościerzyna County, Pomeranian Voivodeship, in northern Poland.

For details of the history of the region, see History of Pomerania.
