= Czarna Woda =

Town in Poland

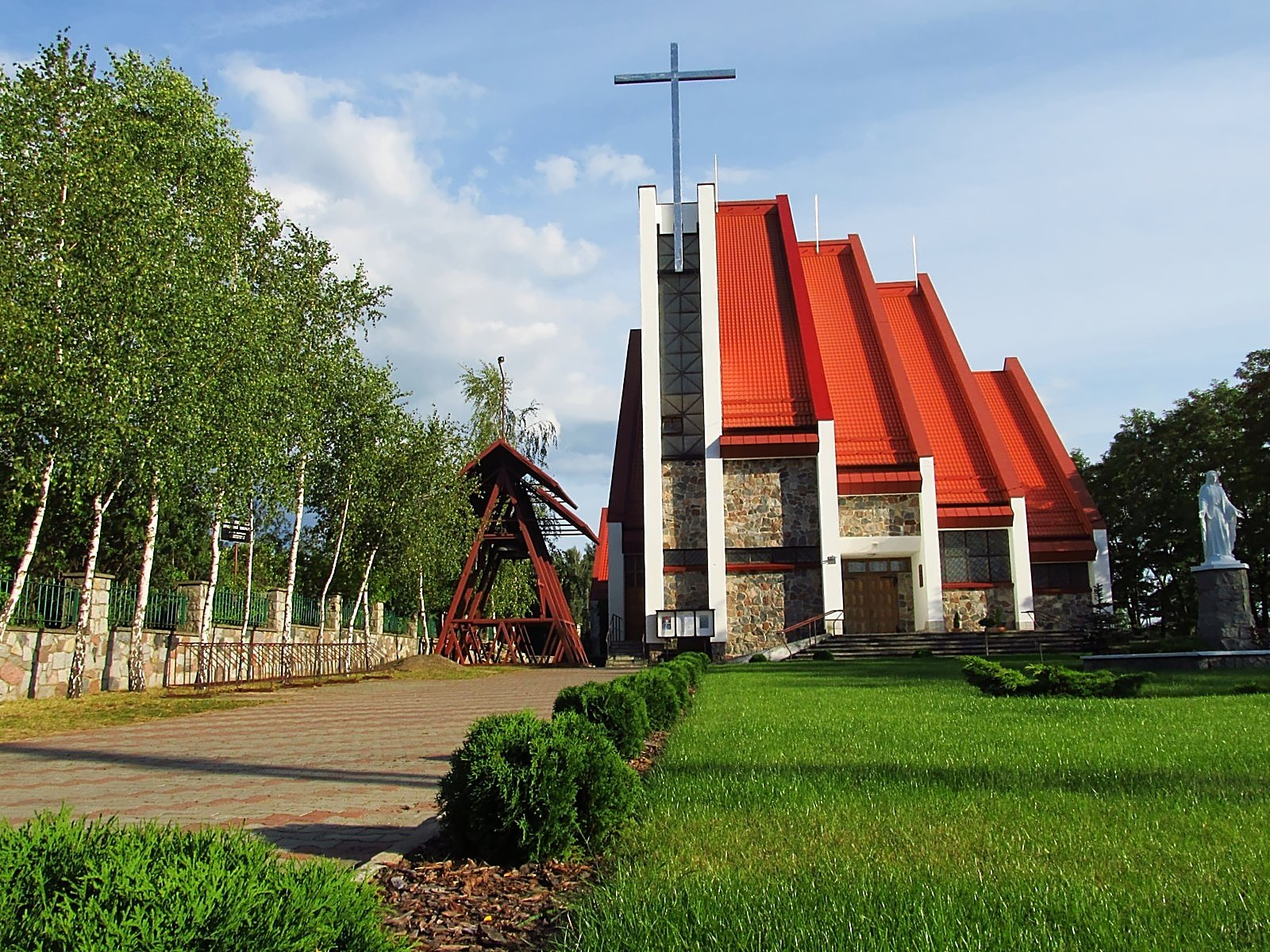
- Our Lady of Częstochowa church in Czarna Woda

- Coat of arms

- Location within Poland
- Coordinates: 53°50′N 18°6′E
- Country: Poland
- Voivodeship: Pomeranian
- County: Starogard
- Gmina: Czarna Woda (urban gmina)
- Town rights: 1993

Government
  - Mayor: Arkadiusz Piotr Gliniecki

Area
  - Total: 9.9 km^{2} (3.8 sq mi)

Population (31 December 2021)
  - Total: 2,735
  - Density: 280/km^{2} (720/sq mi)
- Time zone: UTC+1 (CET)
  - Summer (DST): UTC+2 (CEST)
- Postal code: 83-262
- Area code: +48 58
- Vehicle registration: GST
- Website: https://www.czarna-woda.pl

Czarna Woda [ˈt͡ʂarna ˈvɔda] is a town in Starogard County, Pomeranian Voivodeship, in northern Poland, with 2,735 inhabitants as of December 2021. It is located within the ethnocultural region of Kociewie within Pomerania.

The town's name translates to "Black Water".

According to the 1921 census, Czarna Woda had a population of 561, 99.8% Polish.

== Gallery ==
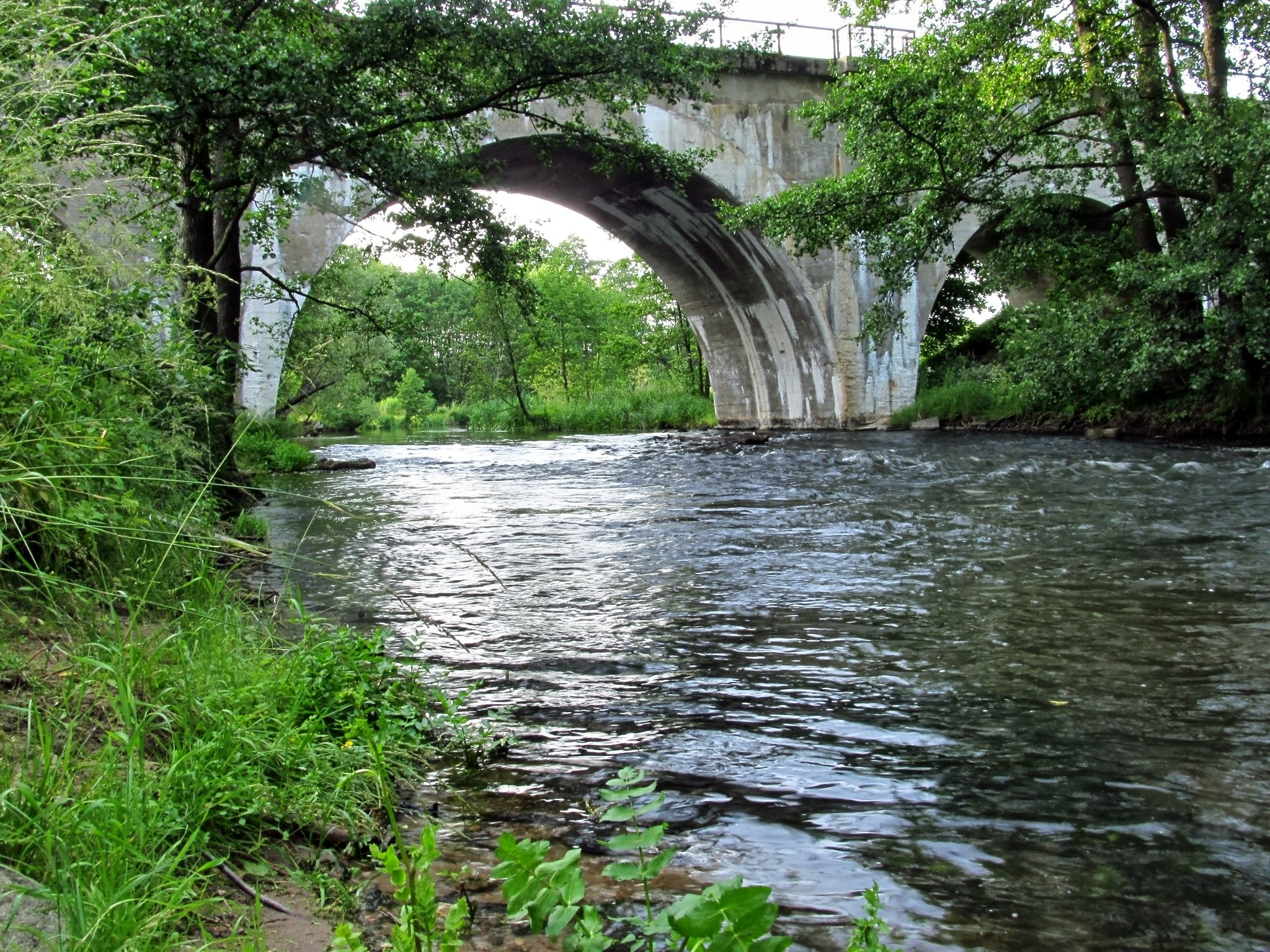
Railway bridge over Wda river in Czarna Woda

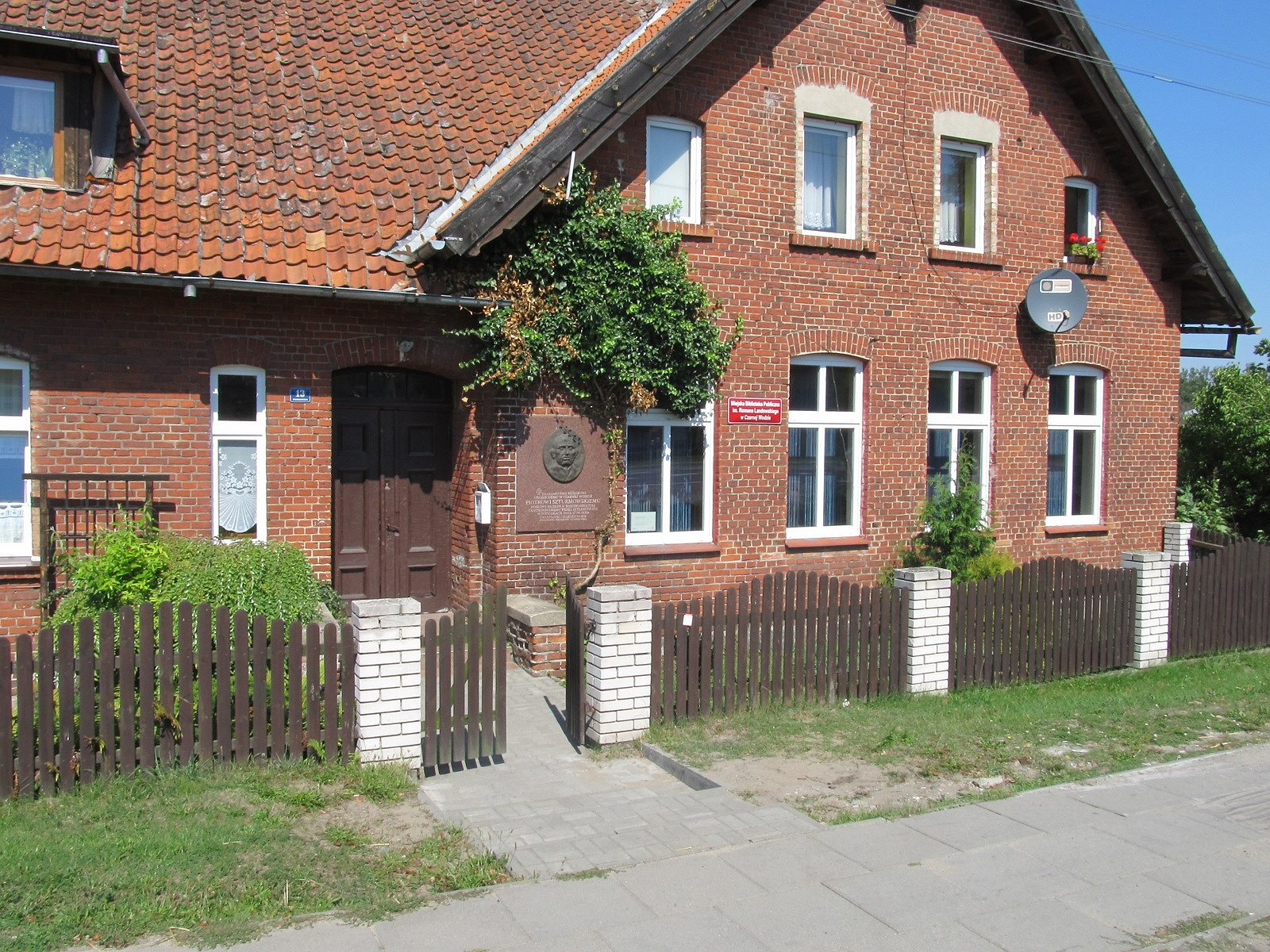
Municipal Library

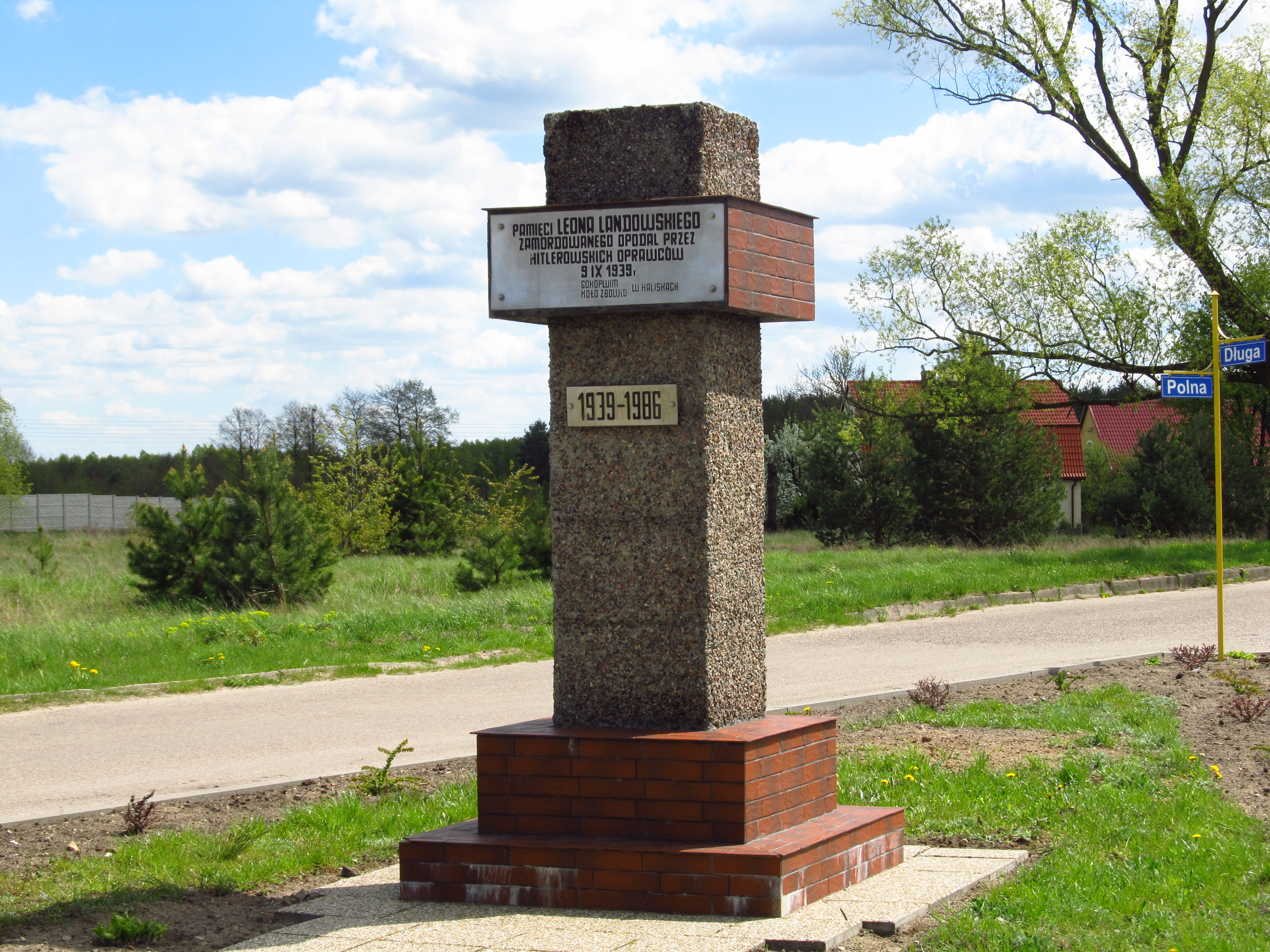
Memorial to Leon Landowski, local publicist murdered by German invaders in WW2

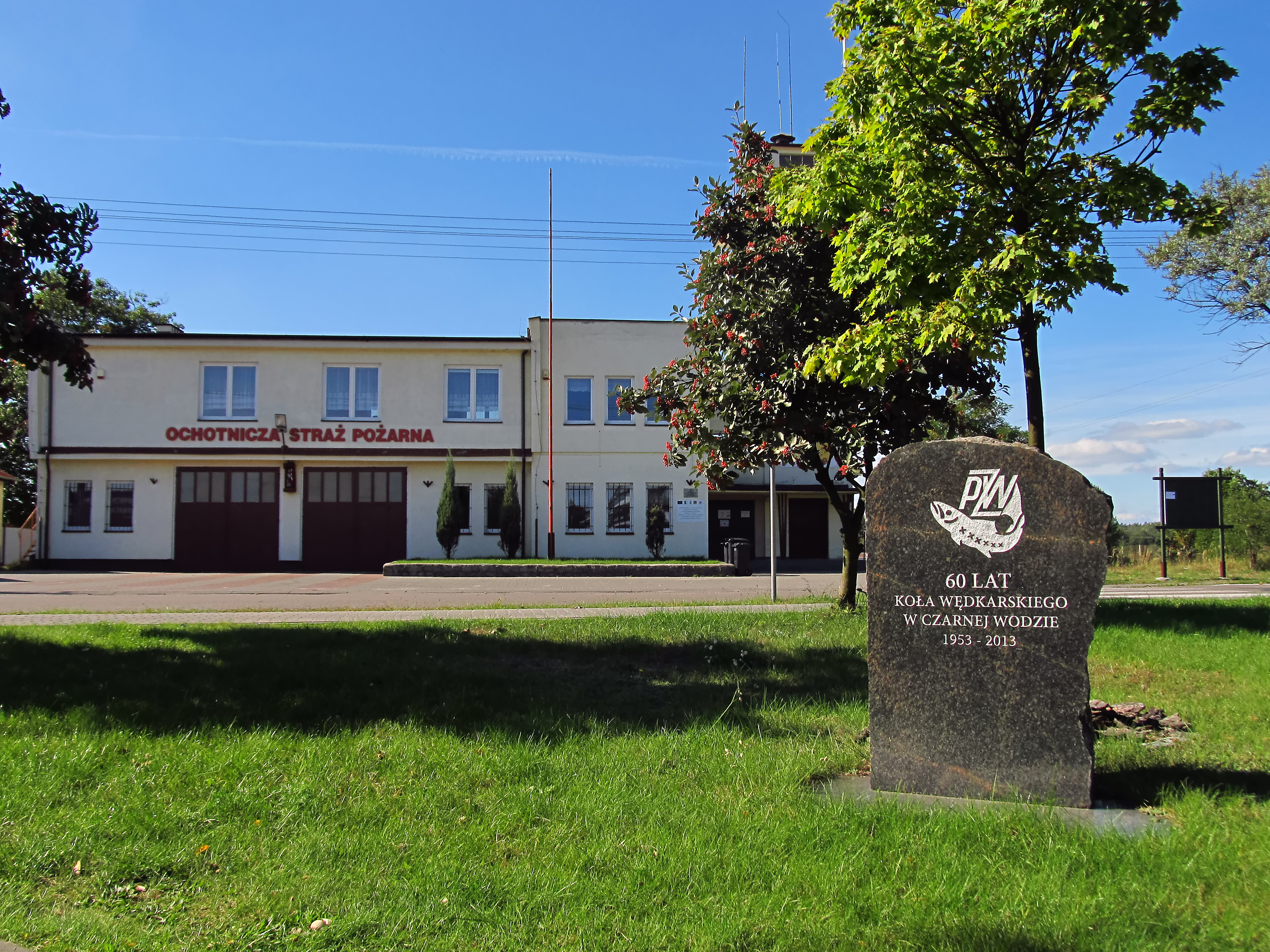
Fire department
