= Bolesław Domański =

Polish priest (1872–1939)

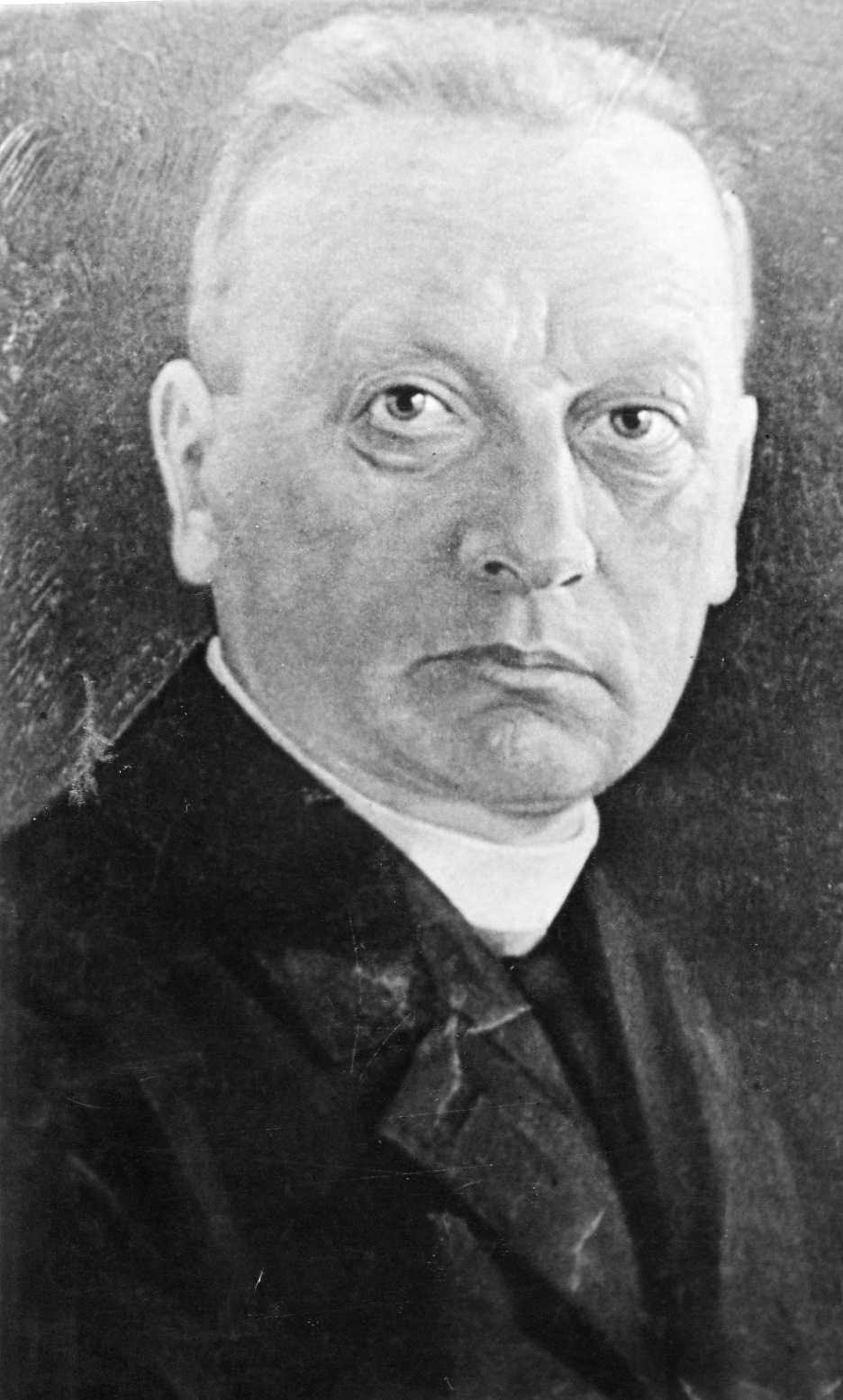
- Bolesław Domański, unknown date

Personal details
- Born: 14 January 1872 Przytarnia, Germany
- Died: 21 April 1939 (aged 67) Berlin, Germany
- Denomination: Catholic

Bolesław Domański (14 January 1872 – 21 April 1939) was a famous Polish Catholic Priest, and was the President of the Union of Poles in Germany from 1931 to 1939. He served as the Parson of the Zakrzewo Parish from 1903 to 1939. Domański was a fighter for the rights of the Polish minority in Grenzmark Posen-West Prussia, at the time a Prussian province on the border of Germany and Poland, as well as for the rights of Polish emigrants in the Ruhr area.

== Life ==
Bolesław Domański was born on 14 January 1872 in Przytarnia, Kingdom of Prussia, German Empire.
