= Malary, Kościerzyna County =

Malary
- Village
- Location within Poland
- Coordinates: 53°56′34″N 17°54′37″E
- Country: Poland
- Voivodeship: Pomeranian
- County: Kościerzyna
- Gmina: Karsin
- Population: 21

Malary [maˈlarɨ] is a village in the administrative district of Gmina Karsin, within Kościerzyna County, Pomeranian Voivodeship, in northern Poland.

For details of the history of the region, see History of Pomerania.
