= Osowo, Kościerzyna County =

Osowo
- Village
- Location within Poland
- Coordinates: 53°52′23″N 17°53′28″E
- Country: Poland
- Voivodeship: Pomeranian
- County: Kościerzyna
- Gmina: Karsin
- Population: 607

Osowo ([ɔˈsɔvɔ]; German: Ossowo) is a village in the administrative district of Gmina Karsin, within Kościerzyna County, Pomeranian Voivodeship, in northern Poland.

For details of the history of the region, see History of Pomerania.
