= Olpuch Wdzydze railway station =

Railway station in Szenajda, Poland

Coordinates: 54°01′43″N 18°01′00″E

Olpuch Wdzydze
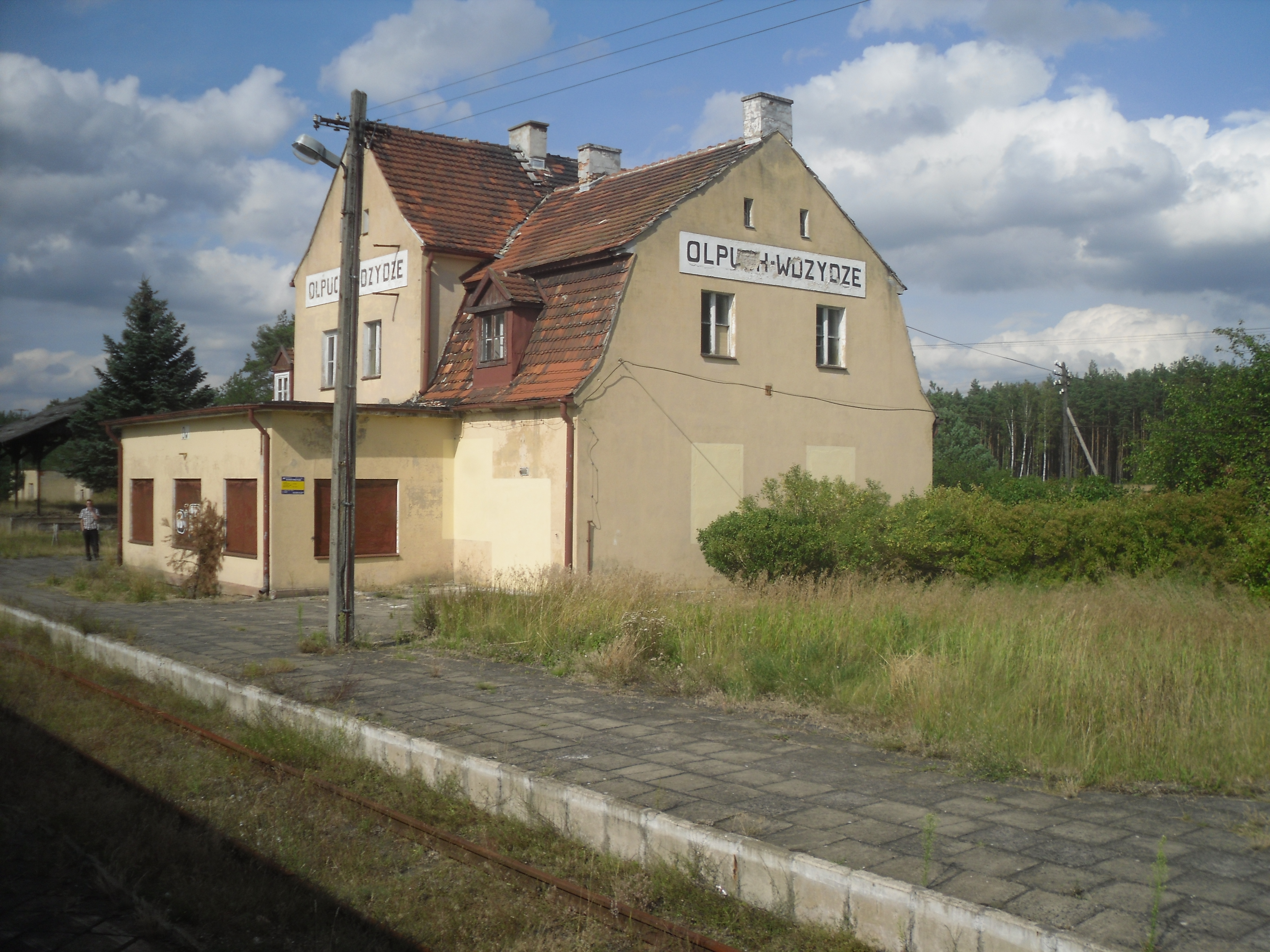

General information
- Location: Olpuch; Poland
- Owner: Polskie Koleje Państwowe S.A.
- Platforms: 2

Construction
- Structure type: Building: Closed; Depot: Never existed Water tower: Never existed

History
- Former names: Klettenhagen
Location

Olpuch Wdzydze is a disused PKP railway station in Olpuch, Pomeranian Voivodeship, Poland.

== Lines crossing the station ==
Start station	End station	Line type
Nowa Wieś Wielka	Gdynia Port Centralny	Passenger/Freight
