= Zabrody, Gmina Karsin =

Zabrody Zôbrodë
- Hamlet
- Location within Poland
- Coordinates: 53°58′9″N 17°57′53″E
- Country: Poland
- Voivodeship: Pomeranian
- County: Kościerzyna
- Gmina: Karsin
- Population: 4

Zabrody [zaˈbrɔdɨ] (Kashubian: Zôbrodë) is a hamlet in the administrative district of Gmina Karsin, within Kościerzyna County, Pomeranian Voivodeship, in northern Poland.

For details of the history of the region, see History of Pomerania.
