= Abisynia, Kościerzyna County =

Settlement in Kashubia

Abisynia Abisyniô
- Hamlet
- Location within Poland
- Coordinates: 53°55′26″N 17°55′58″E
- Country: Poland
- Voivodeship: Pomeranian
- County: Kościerzyna
- Gmina: Karsin
- Population: 149

Abisynia [abiˈsɨɲa] (Kashubian: Abisyniô) is a hamlet in the administrative district of Gmina Karsin, within Kościerzyna County, Pomeranian Voivodeship, in northern Poland.

For details of the history of the region, see History of Pomerania.
