= Lipa, Pomeranian Voivodeship =

Lipa
- Settlement
- Location within Poland
- Coordinates: 53°59′25″N 17°55′35″E
- Country: Poland
- Voivodeship: Pomeranian
- County: Kościerzyna
- Gmina: Karsin
- Population: 12

Lipa [ˈlipa] is a settlement in the administrative district of Gmina Karsin, within Kościerzyna County, Pomeranian Voivodeship, in northern Poland.

For details of the history of the region, see History of Pomerania.

== Geography ==
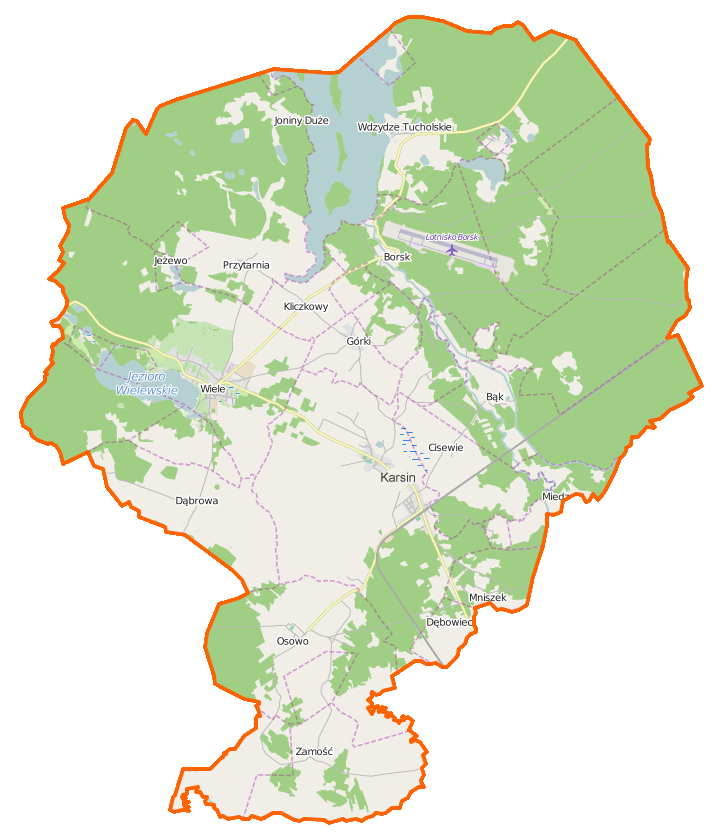
Karsin (gmina) location map
