= Przytarnia =

- Village
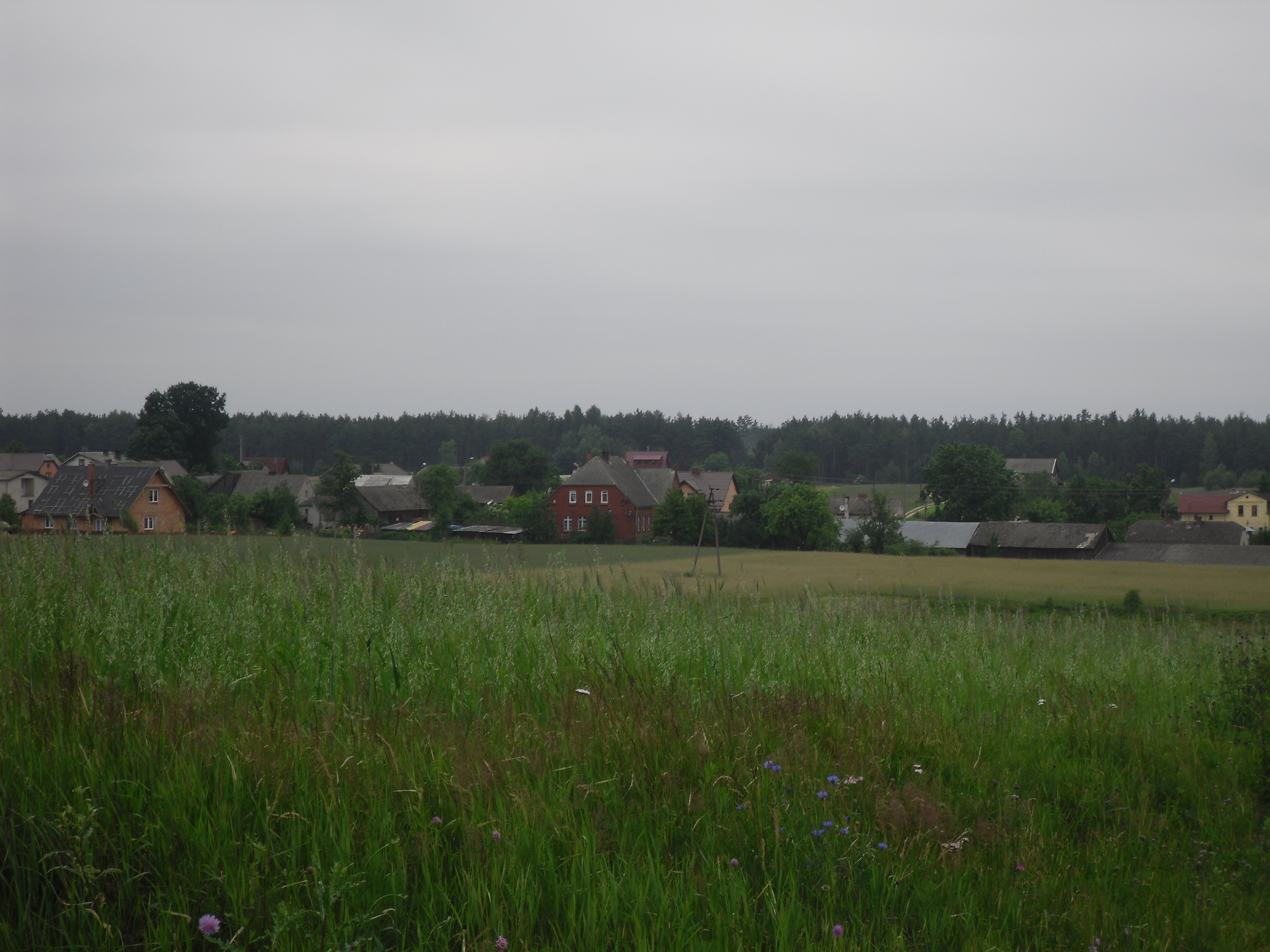

- Location within Poland
- Coordinates: 53°56′56″N 17°52′23″E
- Country: Poland
- Voivodeship: Pomeranian
- County: Kościerzyna
- Gmina: Karsin
- Population: 187
- Time zone: UTC+1 (CET)
  - Summer (DST): UTC+2 (CEST)
- Vehicle registration: GKS

Przytarnia [pʂɨˈtarɲa] is a village in the administrative district of Gmina Karsin, within Kościerzyna County, Pomeranian Voivodeship, in northern Poland. It is located within the ethnocultural region of Kashubia in the historic region of Pomerania.

== History ==
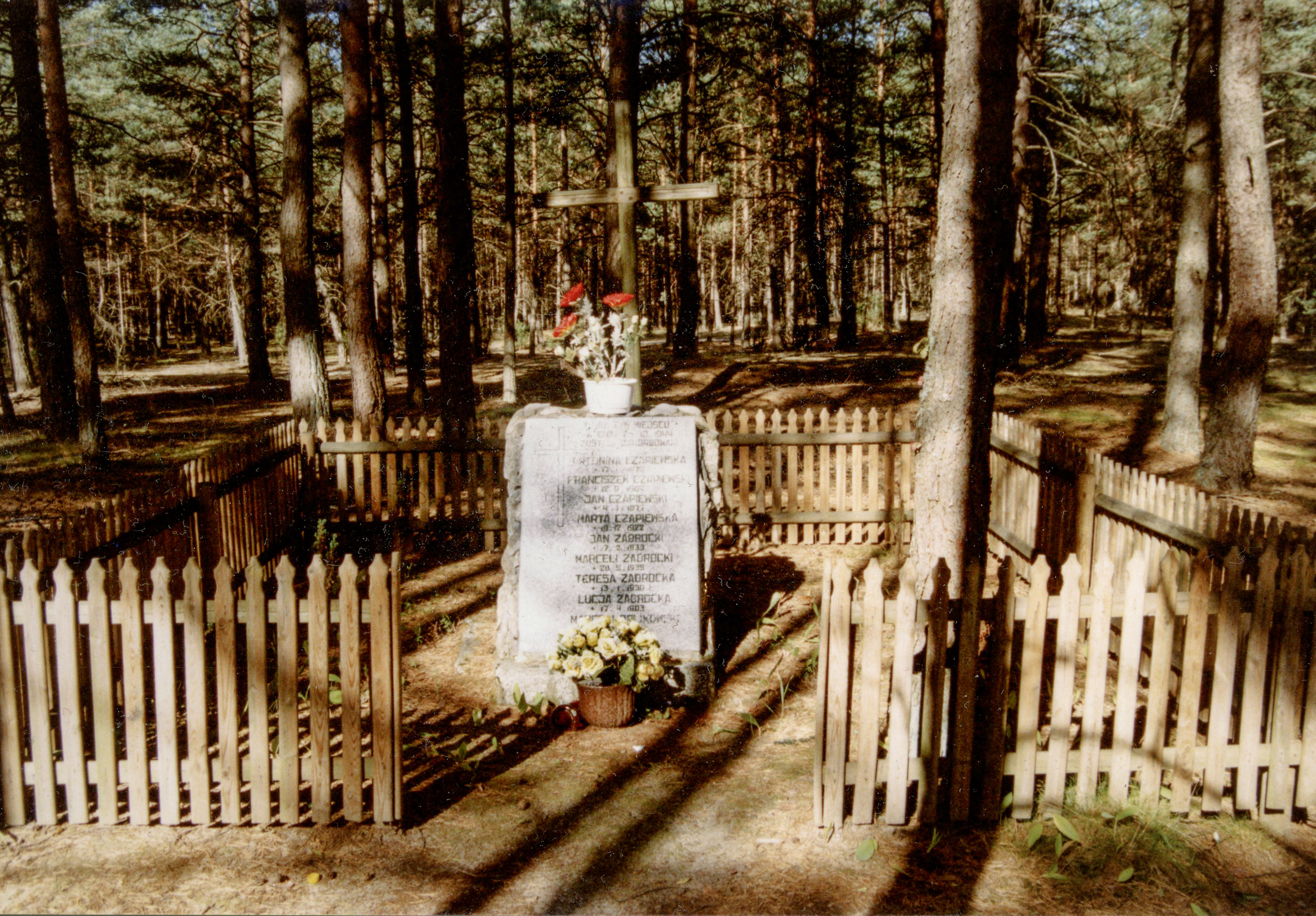
Memorial at the site of a German massacre of Poles carried out in 1944

Przytarnia was a royal village of the Polish Crown, administratively located in the Tuchola County in the Pomeranian Voivodeship.

During the German occupation of Poland (World War II), the Germans carried out a massacre of nine Poles including women and children in October 1944 (see also Nazi crimes against the Polish nation). There is a memorial at the site.

== Notable people ==
- Bolesław Domański, Polish Catholic priest, representative of the Polish minority in Germany, president of the Union of Poles in Germany
