= Zamość, Pomeranian Voivodeship =

Zamość Zamòsc
- Village
- Location within Poland
- Coordinates: 53°50′53″N 17°53′45″E
- Country: Poland
- Voivodeship: Pomeranian
- County: Kościerzyna
- Gmina: Karsin
- Population: 131

Zamość (Polish: [ˈzamɔɕt͡ɕ]; Kashubian: Zamòsc) is a village in the administrative district of Gmina Karsin, within Kościerzyna County, Pomeranian Voivodeship, in northern Poland.

For details of the history of the region, see History of Pomerania.
