= Gmina Karsin =

Gmina of Kashubia

Gmina Karsin Karsin Commune
- Gmina
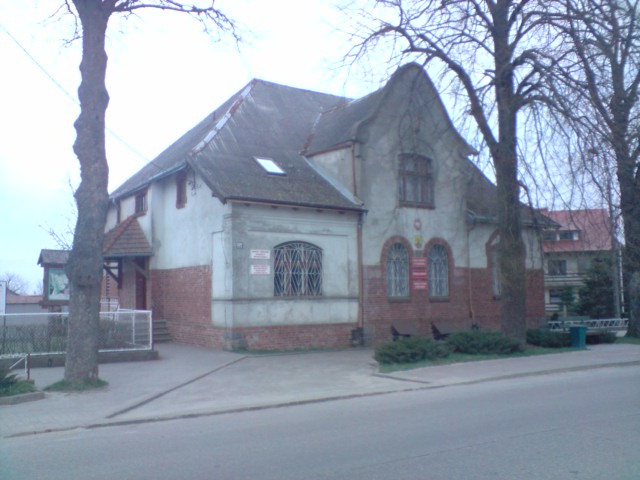
- The gmina's office in Karsin

- Coat of arms
- Interactive map of Gmina Karsin
- Coordinates (Karsin): 53°54′18″N 17°55′42″E
- Country: Poland
- Voivodeship: Pomeranian
- County: Kościerzyna
- Seat: Karsin

Area
  - Total: 169.2 km^{2} (65.3 sq mi)

Population (2022)
  - Total: 6,173
  - Density: 36.48/km^{2} (94.49/sq mi)
- Website: http://www.karsin.pl

Gmina Karsin (Kashubian: Gmina Kôrsëno) is a rural gmina (administrative district) in Kościerzyna County, Pomeranian Voivodeship, in northern Poland. Its seat is the village of Karsin, which lies approximately 24 kilometres (15 mi) south of Kościerzyna and 69 km (43 mi) south-west of the regional capital Gdańsk.

The gmina covers an area of 169.2 square kilometres (65.3 sq mi), and as of 2022 its total population was 6,173.

The gmina contains part of the protected area called Wdydze Landscape Park.

== Villages ==
Gmina Karsin contains the villages and settlements of Abisynia, Bąk, Białe Błoto, Borsk, Cisewie, Dąbrowa, Dębowiec, Górki, Jasnochówka, Joniny Małe, Joniny Wielkie, Karsin, Kliczkowy, Knieja, Lipa, Malary, Miedzno, Mniszek, Osowo, Piątkowo, Podrąbiona, Popia Góra, Przydół, Przytarnia, Robaczkowo, Rogalewo, Wdzydze Tucholskie, Wiele, Zabrody, Zamość and Żebrowo.

== Neighbouring gminas ==
Gmina Karsin is bordered by the gminas of Brusy, Czersk, Dziemiany, Kościerzyna and Stara Kiszewa.
