= Joniny Wielkie =

- Settlement
- Location within Poland
- Coordinates: 53°58′30″N 17°52′27″E
- Country: Poland
- Voivodeship: Pomeranian
- County: Kościerzyna
- Gmina: Karsin
- Population: 2

Joniny Wielkie [jɔˈninɨ ˈvjɛlkʲɛ] is a settlement in the administrative district of Gmina Karsin, within Kościerzyna County, Pomeranian Voivodeship, in northern Poland.

For details of the history of the region, see History of Pomerania.
