= Adam Mniszek =

Polish cavalry lieutenant colonel (1889–1957)

Adam Mniszek (15 November 1889 – 16 November 1957) was a lieutenant colonel in the Cavalry of the Polish Army.

== Career ==
He was one of the founders and a member of the Academic Society of Poland Jagiellonia. During World War I he fought in the Polish Legions as an officer of the second cavalry regiment. On 30 April 1915 he was promoted to warrant officer, and 1 November 1916 to lieutenant colonel.

In the years 1919–1920, during the war with the Bolsheviks, he was assigned to the Supreme Command of the Polish Army. He served as the head of Section 12 Personnel Division IV - Chief Quartermaster (August 1919) and Head of the Section "E" Division V (1 January 1920). On 15 July 1920 Mniszek was approved (1 April 1920) at the rank of major, "in the Cavalry, a group of former Polish Legions".

On 1 June 1921 he served in the Office of the Inner War Council, remaining on the register of Rokitniański Light Horseman Cavalry Regiment. On May 3, 1922, he was verified in the rank of major. In 1923 he served in Division IV of the General Staff in Warsaw, as a director of the office, remaining on the register of the second Rokitiański Light Horseman Cavalry in Bielsko.

On February 1, 1924, he was transferred to inactive status for a period of six months. Then he lived in Warsaw at ul Capuchin 5. From 3 November 1924 to 15 October 1925, he attended a training Course IV at the Military Academy in Warsaw. After completing the course and receiving a scientific officer diploma of the General Staff he was reassigned to Division IV of the General Staff. In 1924 he returned to his parent regiment.

In March 1926 he was a military road commissioner in the Division of IV SG. In 1928, again in the 2nd Rokitniański Light Horseman Cavalry Regiment as a commanding officer of the squadron. On 23 January 1929, he was promoted to lieutenant colonel with seniority (from 1 January 1929) and in July of that year he was appointed to the position of deputy commander 4 Mounted Riflemen in Płock.

In June 1930 he was transferred to the post of staff officer to the Chief of the General Staff, General Tadeusz Piskor and head of the Department of Personnel Certified Officers. In January 1932, after assuming the position of Chief of the General Staff by General Janusz Gąsiorowski, Mniszek was transferred to the position of Chief of Staff delegate at the Regional Directorate of State Railways in Warsaw. From 1 September 1932 to 1 September 1939, he was the assistant of General Tadeusz Kutrzeba, commander of the Military Academy in Warsaw.

In autumn 1937 the head of the General Staff, General Vaclav Stachiewicz commanded Mniszek to prepare the mobilization of the Headquarters of the Supreme Commander. In March 1939 General Stachiewicz appointed him to the post of commander of the Headquarters of the Supreme Commander. During the September campaign (1-18 September 1939) Mniszek was the commander of the Headquarters of the Supreme Commander in Warsaw, in Brest (September 6), Włodzimierz Wołyński (September 11), Młynów (September 14) and Kołomyja. On September 18, 1939, in Kuty he crossed the border into Romania, and then went on to Storożyniec. On September 24, 1939, Mniszek was commanded by General Tadeusz Malinowski to regroup KG NW region of Tulcza and Babadag. On September 25, 1939, in Ploesta, Mniszek handed his task of abolishing the Headquarters of the Supreme Commander to his deputy Major Zygmunt Cierpicki, while he himself went to Bucharest.

From September 28 to December 23, 1939, while at the Polish Embassy in Bucharest, Mniszek was commanded by military attaché, lieutenant colonel. dipl. Tadeusz Zakrzewski to deal with the evacuation of Polish doctors and veterinarians, pharmacists, PCK sisters, officers, auditors, officers geographers, engineers and technicians to France.

In May 1940 the Supreme Commander and Minister of Military Affairs, General Wladyslaw Sikorski appointed him to the post of head of the Department of Higher Commands and Staff Officers Chartered in Supreme Commander, but he didn't assume this position because he was moved back to the officer's rallying station in Camp Carpiagne (franc. Camp de Carpiagne). His retirement followed allegations that were made against him by the Office of Registration of the Ministry of Military Affairs, headed by a cavalryman, Frederick Mally. In the opinion of the person concerned, the allegations against him were related to "harassment of qualified officers" and activities as commander of the Headquarters of the Supreme Commander during the September campaign.

== See also ==
- Polish Legions in World War I
- Polish–Soviet War
