= Joniny Małe =

- Settlement
- Location within Poland
- Coordinates: 53°58′38″N 17°53′30″E
- Country: Poland
- Voivodeship: Pomeranian
- County: Kościerzyna
- Gmina: Karsin
- Population: 6

Joniny Małe [jɔˈninɨ ˈmawɛ] is a settlement in the administrative district of Gmina Karsin, within Kościerzyna County, Pomeranian Voivodeship, in northern Poland.

For details of the history of the region, see History of Pomerania.
