= Błędno, Pomeranian Voivodeship =

Village in Pomeranian Voivodeship, Poland

Błędno
- Village
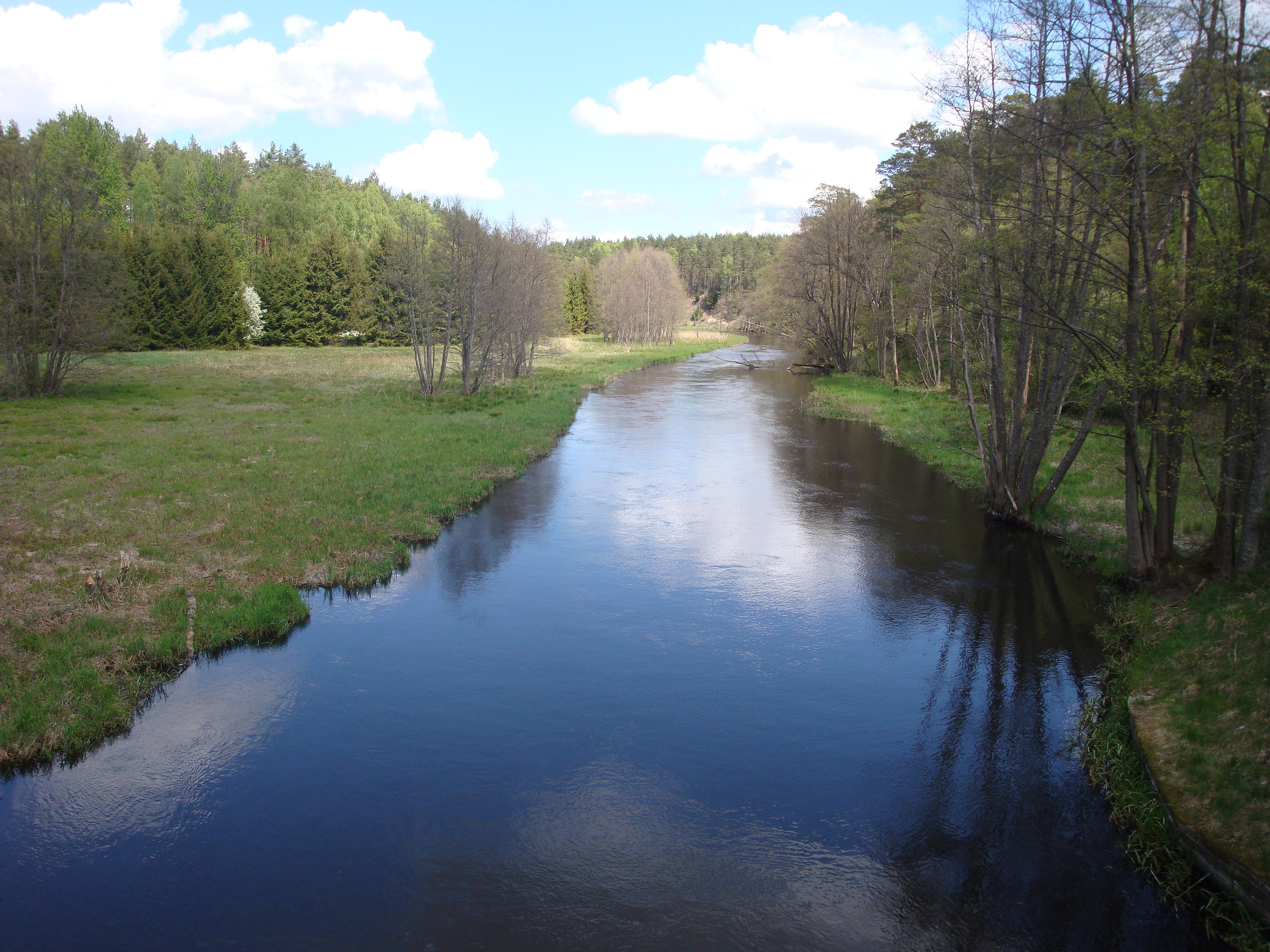
- Wda River in Błędno

- Location within Poland
- Coordinates: 53°42′9″N 18°20′53″E
- Country: Poland
- Voivodeship: Pomeranian
- County: Starogard
- Gmina: Osiek
- Time zone: UTC+1 (CET)
  - Summer (DST): UTC+2 (CEST)
- Vehicle registration: GST

Błędno [ˈbwɛndnɔ] is a village in the administrative district of Gmina Osiek, within Starogard County, Pomeranian Voivodeship, in northern Poland. It is located in the ethnocultural region of Kociewie in the historic region of Pomerania.
