= Miedzno, Kościerzyna County =

Miedzno
- Village
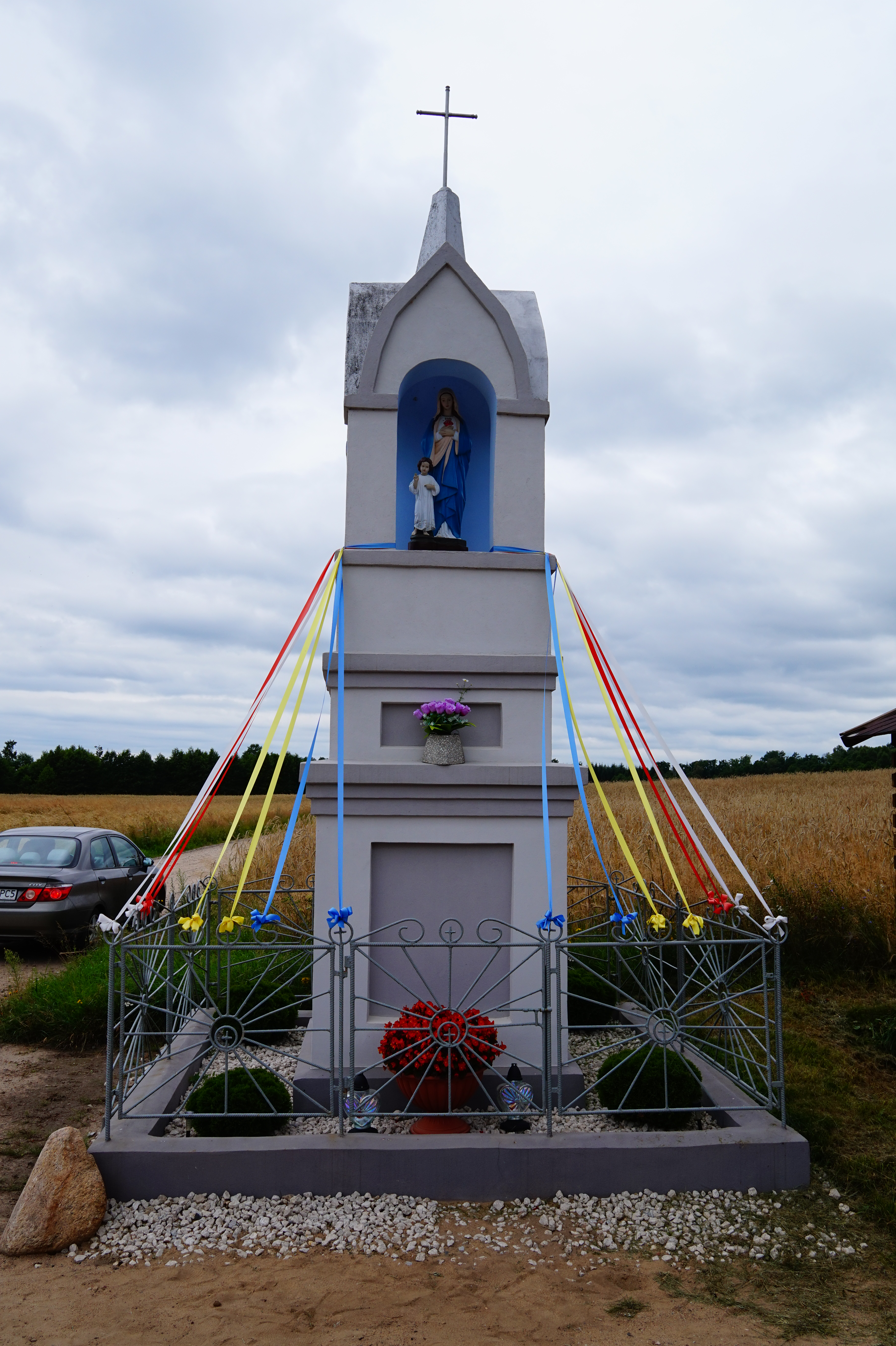

- Location within Poland
- Coordinates: 53°54′2″N 17°58′55″E
- Country: Poland
- Voivodeship: Pomeranian
- County: Kościerzyna
- Gmina: Karsin
- Population: 37

Miedzno [ˈmjɛd͡znɔ] is a village in the administrative district of Gmina Karsin, within Kościerzyna County, Pomeranian Voivodeship, in northern Poland.

For details of the history of the region, see History of Pomerania.
