= Tleń =

Village in Kociewie

- Village
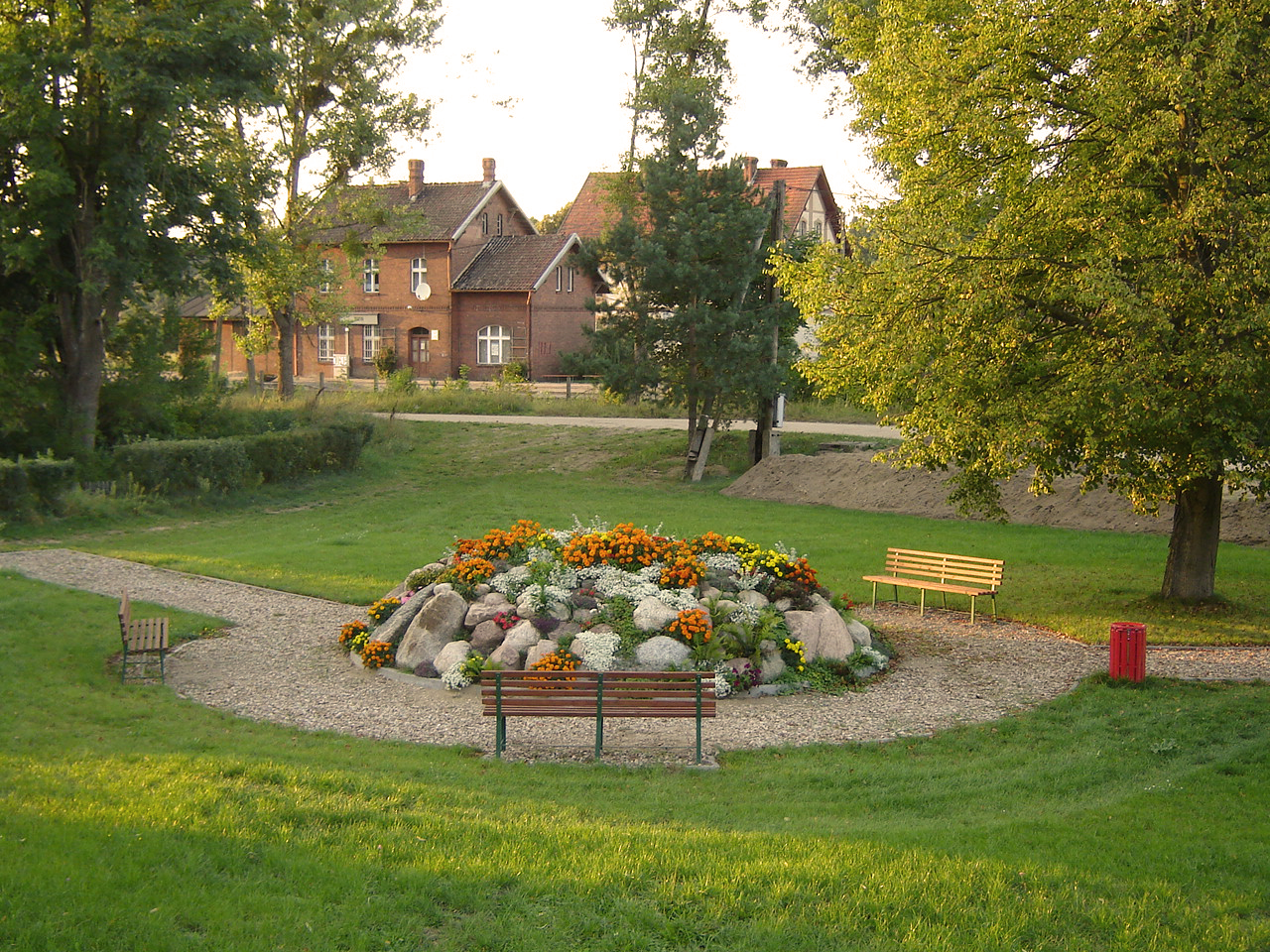
- Square in Tleń

- Location within Poland
- Coordinates: 53°36′44″N 18°15′54″E
- Country: Poland
- Voivodeship: Kuyavian-Pomeranian
- County: Świecie
- Gmina: Osie

Population
  - Total: 282

Tleń [tlɛɲ] is a village in the administrative district of Gmina Osie, within Świecie County, Kuyavian-Pomeranian Voivodeship, in north-central Poland. As of December 2016, the town has a population of 282.
