= Wdzydze Lake =

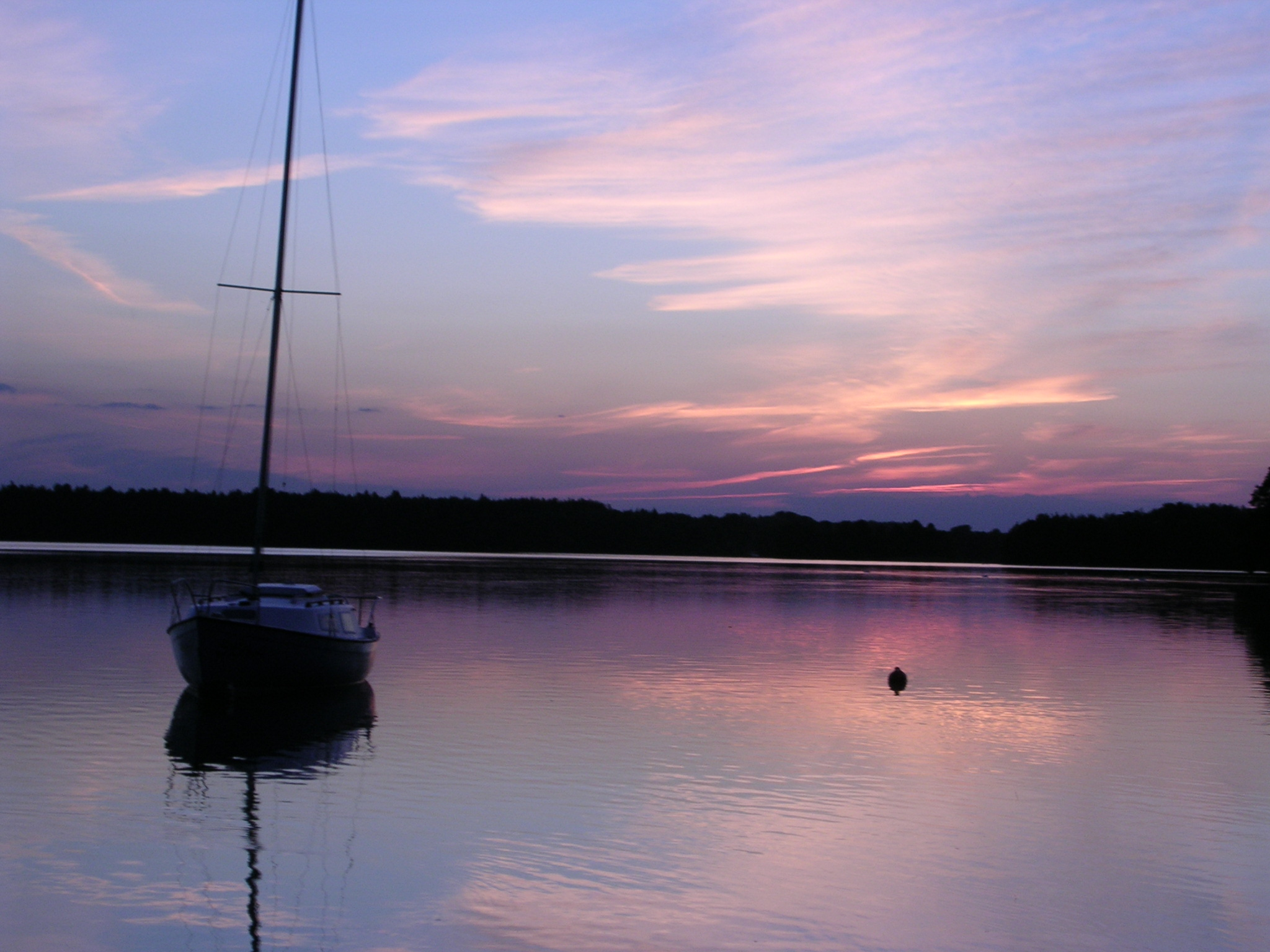
- Wdzydze Lake

- Location within Poland Location within Pomeranian Voivodeship
- Coordinates: 53°58′31″N 17°54′19″E
- Type: reservoir
- Primary inflows: Wda
- Primary outflows: Wda
- Basin countries: Poland
- Surface area: 14.5 km^{2} (5.6 sq mi)
- Average depth: 15.2 m (50 ft)
- Max. depth: 69.5 m (228 ft)
- Water volume: 220,800,000 m^{3} (179,000 acre⋅ft)
- Surface elevation: 134.1 m (440 ft)
- Islands: Ostrów Wielki, Ostrów Mały, Sorka, Sidły and Glonek
- Settlements: Wdzydze Tucholskie

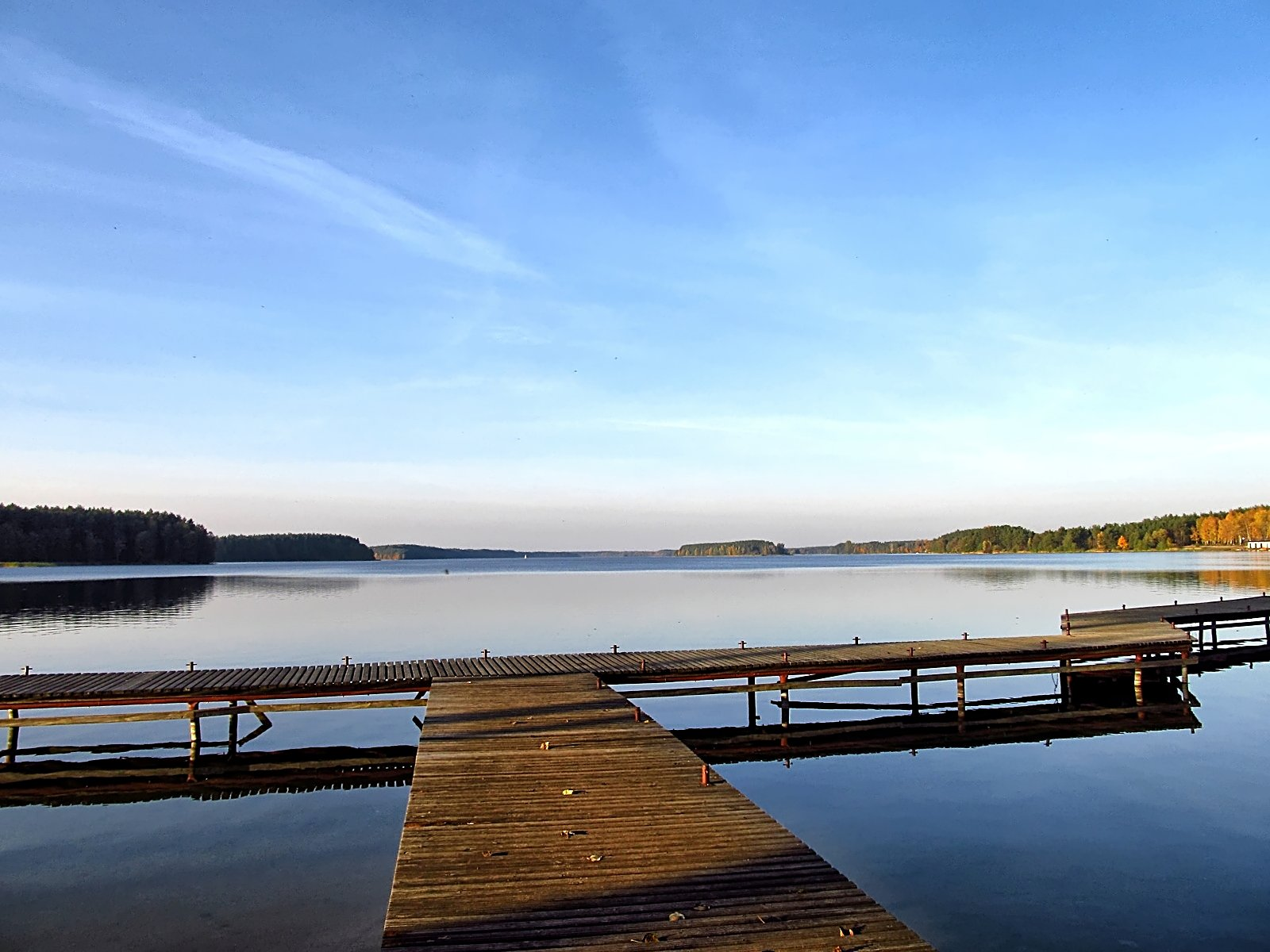
The view to the lake from a pier.

Wdzydze (Kashubian Jezoro Wdzydzczé), also known as the Kashubian Sea, Big Water and Szerzawa, is a lake in the Tuchola Forest in the Kościerzyna County (Pomeranian Voivodeship), in the region of South Kashubia in northern Poland.

The lake is part of a system of linked lakes, comprising Wdzydze, Radolne, Gołuń, Jelenie, and Słupinko.

The whole lake is part of the Wdzydze Landscape Park.

The lake has many large islands (including Ostrów Wielki, which is inhabited; Ostrów Mały; Sorka; Sidły; and Glonek), the total area of which is 150.7 hectares. The river Wda flows through the lake.

The lake is said to be inhabited by brown trout, but the fish's presence in the lake is disputed by ichthyologists.
