= Borsk =

- Village
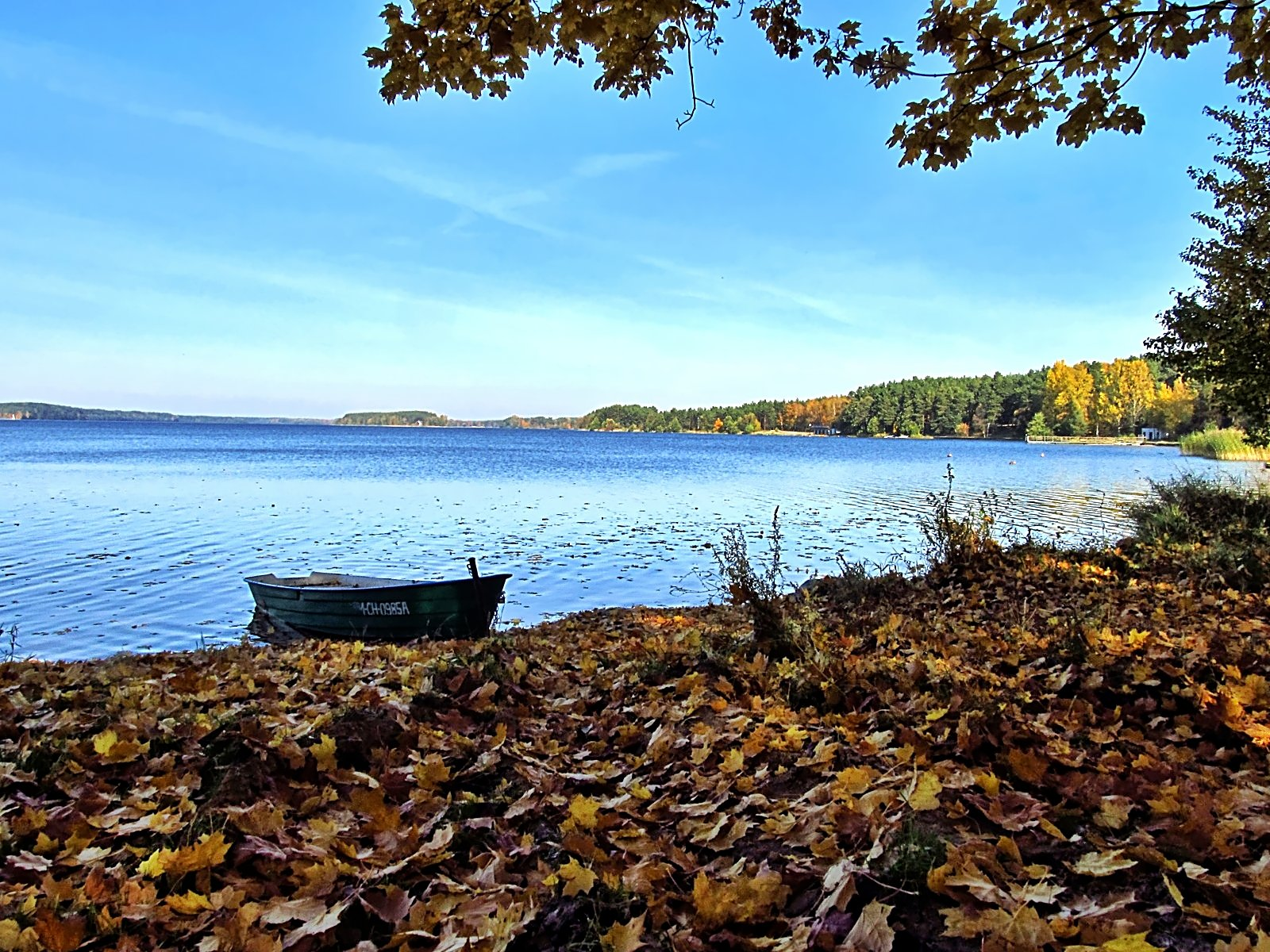
- Wdzydze Lake

- Location within Poland
- Coordinates: 53°57′0″N 17°55′27″E
- Country: Poland
- Voivodeship: Pomeranian
- County: Kościerzyna
- Gmina: Karsin
- Population: 160
- Time zone: UTC+1 (CET)
  - Summer (DST): UTC+2 (CEST)
- Vehicle registration: GKS

Borsk [bɔrsk] is a village in the administrative district of Gmina Karsin, within Kościerzyna County, Pomeranian Voivodeship, in northern Poland. It is located within the ethnocultural region of Kashubia in the historic region of Pomerania.

Borsk was a royal village of the Polish Crown, administratively located in the Tuchola County in the Pomeranian Voivodeship.
