= Wdzydze Tucholskie =

Wdzydze Tucholskie Rëbôczi
- Village
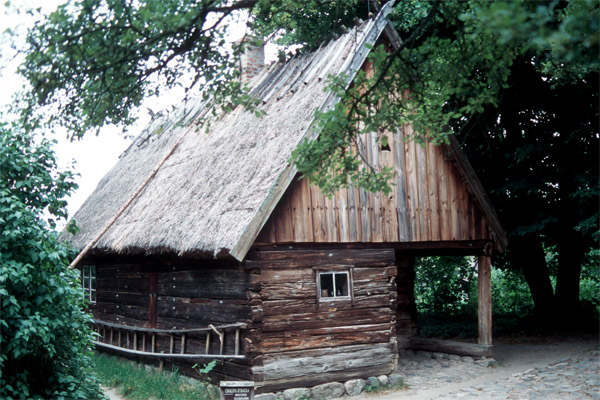
- A traditional dwelling from the village reconstructed at the Kashubian Ethnographic Park

- Location within Poland
- Coordinates: 53°58′27″N 17°55′42″E
- Country: Poland
- Voivodeship: Pomeranian
- County: Kościerzyna
- Gmina: Karsin
- Population: 260

Wdzydze Tucholskie [ˈvd͡zɨd͡zɛ tuˈxɔlskʲɛ] (Kashubian: Rëbôczi) is a village in the administrative district of Gmina Karsin, within Kościerzyna County, Pomeranian Voivodeship, in northern Poland.

For details of the history of the region, see History of Pomerania.
