= Karsin =

Village in Kashubia

Karsin Kôrsëno
- Village
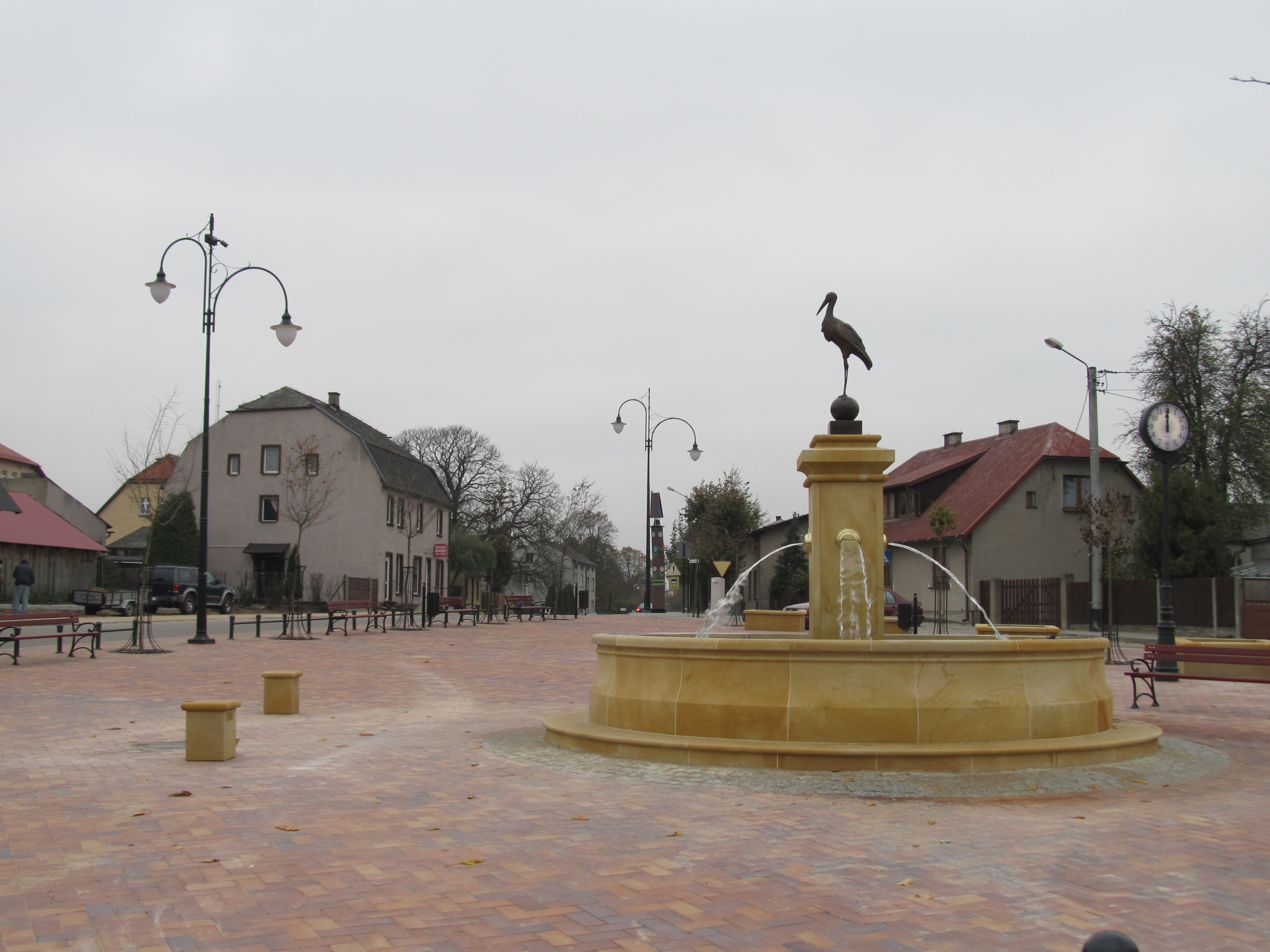
- The central square

- Location within Poland
- Coordinates: 53°54′18″N 17°55′42″E
- Country: Poland
- Voivodeship: Pomeranian
- County: Kościerzyna
- Gmina: Karsin
- Population: 2,005
- Time zone: UTC+1 (CET)
  - Summer (DST): UTC+2 (CEST)
- Vehicle registration: GKS
- Website: www.karsin.pl

Karsin [ˈkarɕin] is a village in Kościerzyna County, Pomeranian Voivodeship, in northern Poland. It is the seat of the gmina (administrative district) called Gmina Karsin. It is located within the historic region of Pomerania.

Karsin was a royal village of the Polish Crown, administratively located in the Tuchola County in the Pomeranian Voivodeship.

== Notable people ==
- Józef Borzyszkowski (born 1946 in Karsin) a Polish historian at Gdańsk University and Kashubian activist
