= Mała Wierzyca =

Location
- Country: Poland

Physical characteristics
- Mouth
  - location: Wierzyca
  - coordinates: 53°58′30″N 18°12′40″E

Basin features
- Progression: Wierzyca→ Vistula→ Baltic Sea

Mała Wierzyca (or Little Wierzyca) is a river of Poland. It is a left-side tributary of the Wierzyca and joins it near Zamek Kiszewski. It flows through the Kashubian Lake District. It flows through Lake Polaszkowskie ("Polaszkowski Protected Landscape Area"), longitudinally through Stare Polaszki and Pałubin, then under the route of voivodeship road no. 214 and flows into the Wierzyca to the east of Kiszewski Castle.

== See also ==
- Rivers of Poland
