= Kashubian Lake District =

Kashubian Lake District Pojezierze Kaszubskie
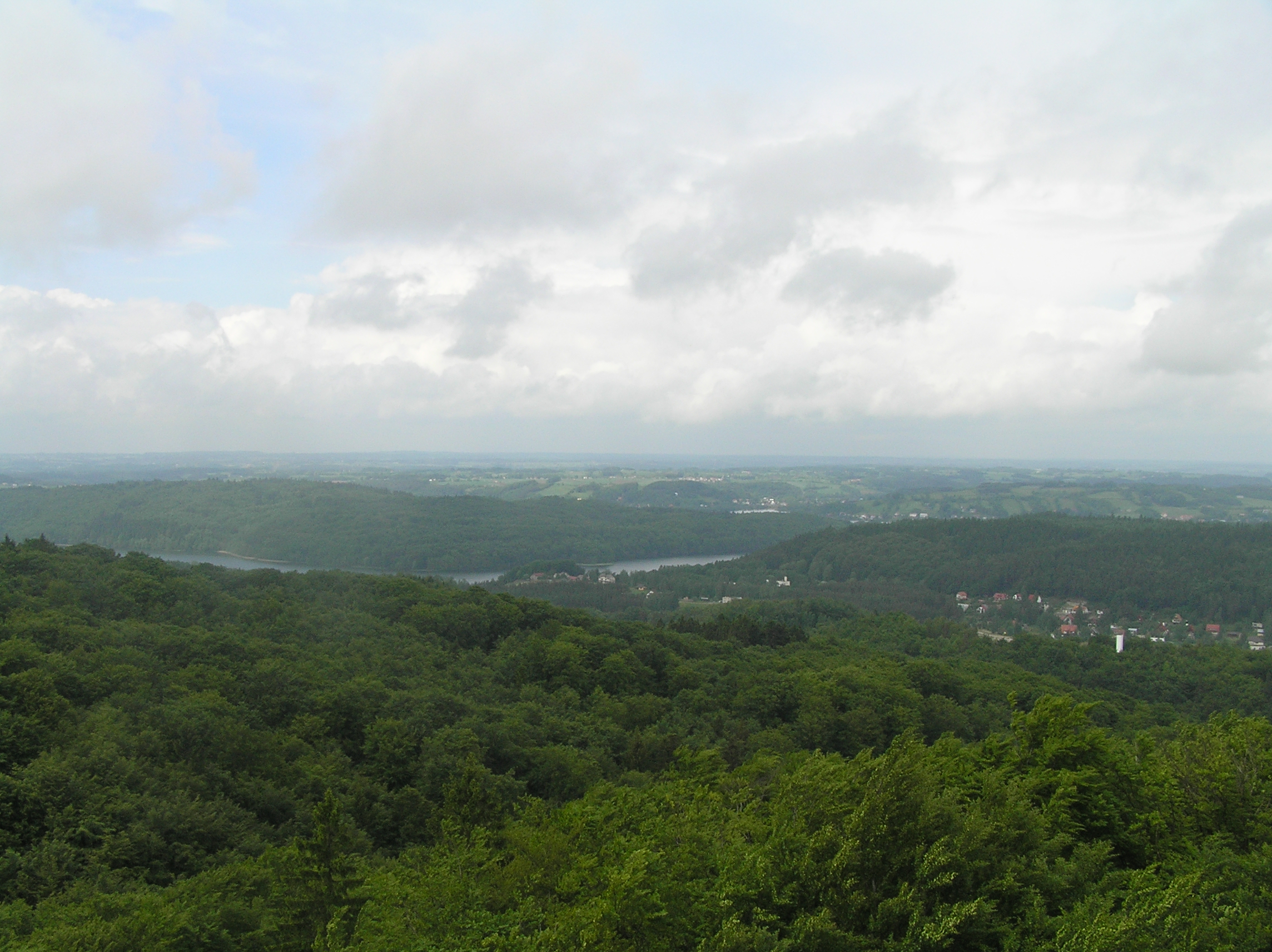
- Upland view of the Ostzyckie Lake

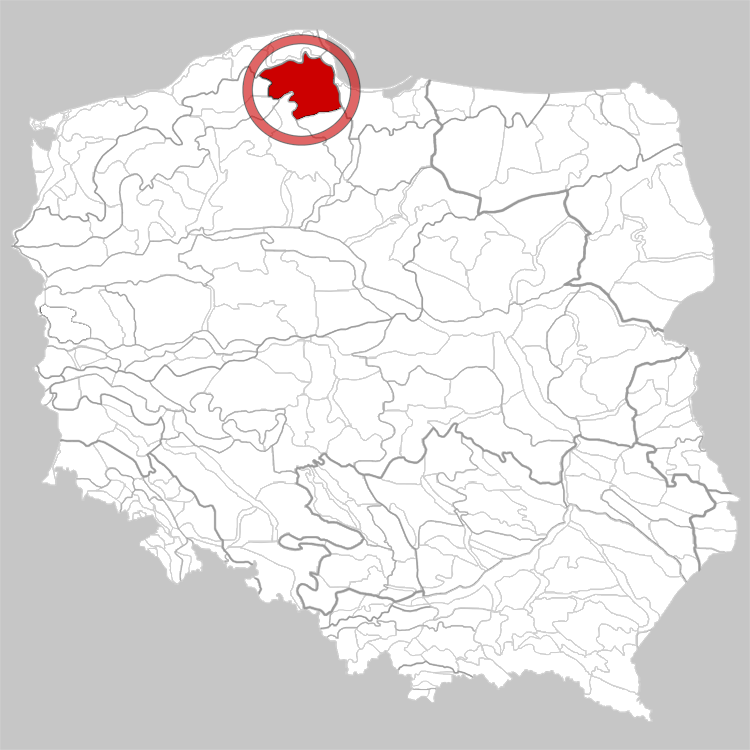
- Location of Kashubian Lake District in Poland
- Country: Poland

Area
  - Total: 3,000 km^{2} (1,200 sq mi)

Kashubian Lake District (Polish: Pojezierze Kaszubskie; Kashubian: Pòjezerzé Kaszëbsczé) (314.51) is a mesoregion part of the Eastern Lake District macroregion, the northernmost of all Pomeranian lake districts. Nearly of the lakes lie at a height from 149 to 216 metres above sea level. The mesoregion is largely populated by Kashubians, from which the name of the region originates. However, because Kashubians also live in the nearby mesoregions, the alternative name for the lake district is the Kartuskie Lake District.

== Borders ==
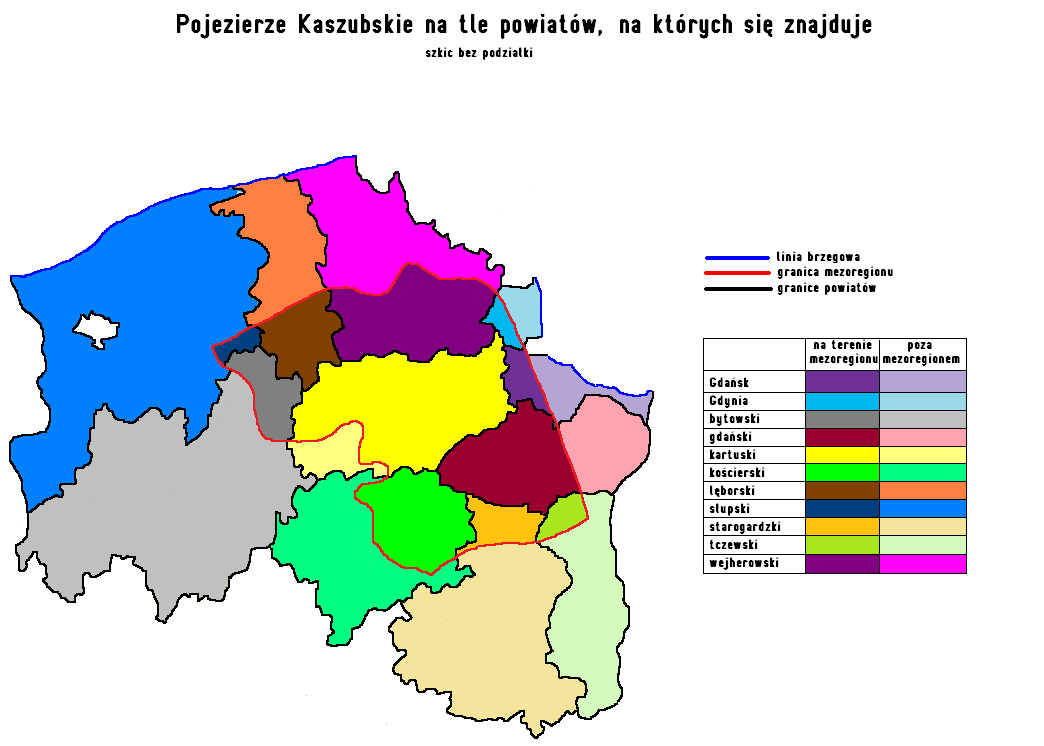
The Kashubian Lake District located on the outlines of powiats it is located in

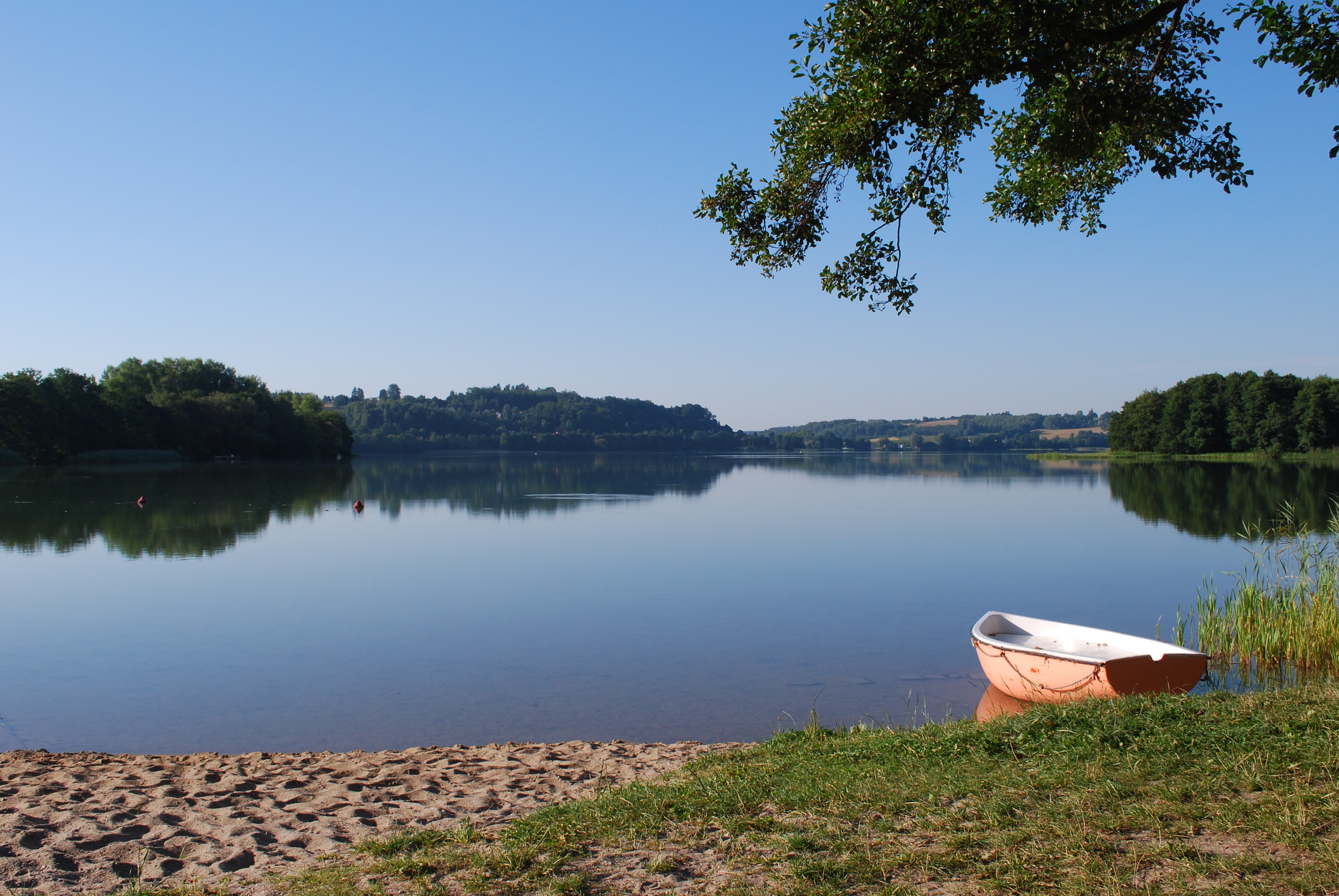
Kłodno Lake

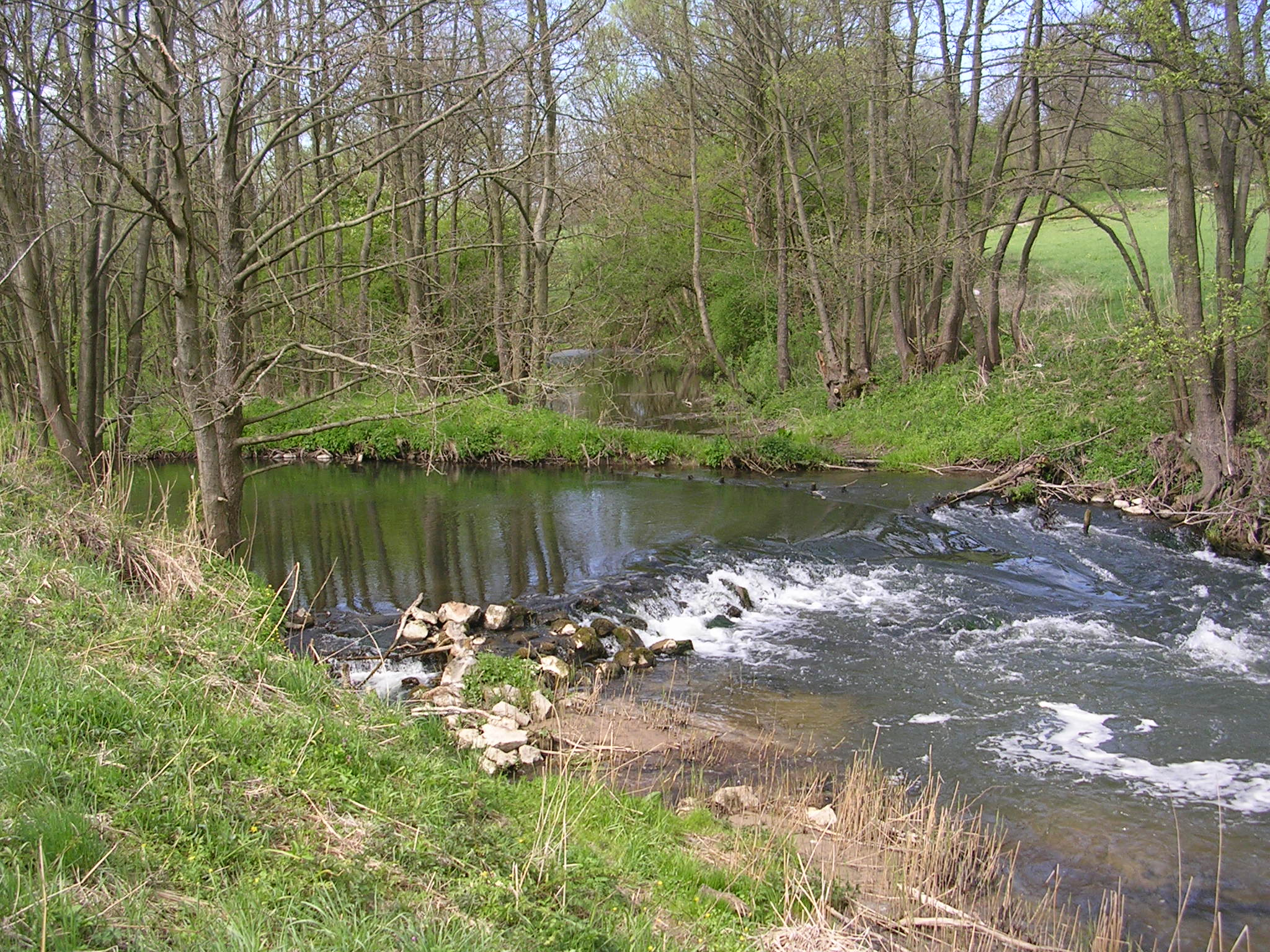
Rapid on the Radunia in the Żukowski Basin

The Kashubian Lake District, according to the division made by Konradzki has an area of about 3000 km km^{2}. To the north, the mesoregion borders with the ice-marginal valley of the river Reda and the river Łeba; which separates the lake district away from the Żarnowiecka Upland, and the Damniacka Upland. From the east (the area of Gdańsk and Gdynia), the lake district is bordered by the Kashubian Coast. Beyond, the region borders with the Starogradzkie Lake District, from the south-east, the region is bordered by the Tucholski Forest. The western border is closed in by the Polanowska Upland.

The Kashubian Lake District is located in the following powiats: Gdańsk, Gdynia, Bytów, Gdańsk, Kartuzy, Kościerzyna, Lębork, Słupsk, Starogard, Tczew, and Wejherowo.

The northern and eastern borders are very clear, and in physiographical terms in this part of Poland are identical. The rest, meaning the western and southern borders, and the new border of south-east, according to J. Konradzki, have the border less geographically separated due to the lack of geographical features.

== Terrain relief ==
The terrain relief of the Kashubian Lake district is undulated, especially in the surrounding of the Kartuzy. The relief is much more stronger in the other mesoregions of the voivodeship, sometimes closely resembling an upland relief, where there are deequalisations of the terrain. In some places (Szymbarskie Uplands), some of the undulations have heights up to 80 metres. The differences between the lowest and highest peak is 160 metres.

The relief of the Kashubian Lake District was caused by several factors: the Scandinavian ice sheet, and river-glacial forms, causing U-shaped valleys. This has caused the region to be labelled a glacial region. Another factor contributing to the relief of the land is the accumulated erosion caused by the rivers.

The moraine uplands dominate the landscape of the mesoregion. The layout of moraines forms homocentric ellipses in the land. The longer pivot of these ellipses agrees more or less with the axis NEE-SWW. However, this isn't an absolute rule for the region, as for example, the ellipses lying in the centre of the Szymbarskie Upland are oriented on the axis E-W.

Both the arrangements of postglacial channel-type lakes and the waterway network have a similar arrangement to radial, reflecting arrangement of gashes of a domed structure area, with the direction however dominating the axis NNE-SWW. The depths of postglacial channel lakes in the Kashubian Lake District are achieving a depth between 20 and 40 metres and the width with an average from 200 up to 1500 metres (on average about 600 metres). The length of single funnel-like lakes fluctuates from 1 km up to 24 km. The inclinations of the slopes reach in places up to 40 °. Single funnel-like lakes often link with river systems e.g. Raduńskie Lakes. A similar formation, found in the Tuchola Forest according to the division of Kondracki, is that of the Wdzydze Lake; on that account included by some researchers, like that of Augustowski to the Kashubian Lake District.

== Waterways ==
According to the regionalisation drawn up by the Ministry of the Environment, the Kashubian Lake District lies, as a whole, in the region of the Lower Vistula, and so its waters are subject to RZGW in Gdańsk. In the Kashubian Lake District, there are over 500 lakes, the relation of the surface area of natural bodies of water, to the surface area of their drainage basin, is 3.5% of the mesoregion. The majority of lakes are of postglacial origin. Most of the lakes are postglacial channel lakes. The flowing rivers through mesoregion, split up the region on all sides, they are all in the drainage basin of the Baltic Sea.

The mesoregion is able to be split in the following river basins: Radunia Reda, Łeba, Motława, Wierzyca, Słupia, and Łupawa. In the division made by Augustowski, and by Kondracki, this region still includes the Wda and Brda river, which do not belong to mesoregion.

== Climate ==
The Kashubian Lake District belongs to the Pomeranian Lake District. There are many meteorological stations found in the Kashubian Lake District. Unfortunately the costs limit the meteorological stations to local changes in temperature, pressure, the wind speed, and similar parameters. The whole of the knowledge about the climate in the Kashubian Lake District comes from field research and meteorological stations found in health resorts. Additionally, the Kashubian Lake District has a large variability in weather, which is quite characteristic feature to the region.

=== Temperature ===
The temperature in January, in the centre of the mesoregion is lower than on its edges – particularly in the Tricity, where the amount in temperature change is about 2.5 °C; similarly in July, however the difference is smaller, scarcely differentiating about 1 °C. Additionally, the length of the vegetation period is about 5–10 days shorter than in neighbouring regions.

Month	January	February	March	April	May	June	July	August	September	October	November	December
Maximum temperature	-0,1	0,7	4,5	10,4	16,3	19,7	21,1	21,0	16,5	11,5	5,1	1,4
Average temperature	-2,7	-2,4	0,4	5,5	11,1	14,8	16,5	16,1	12,3	7,9	2,9	-2,9
Minimal temperature	-5	-5	-2,5	1,8	6,6	10,4	12,4	12,4	9,3	5,4	1	-2,8

== Nature ==
=== Flora ===
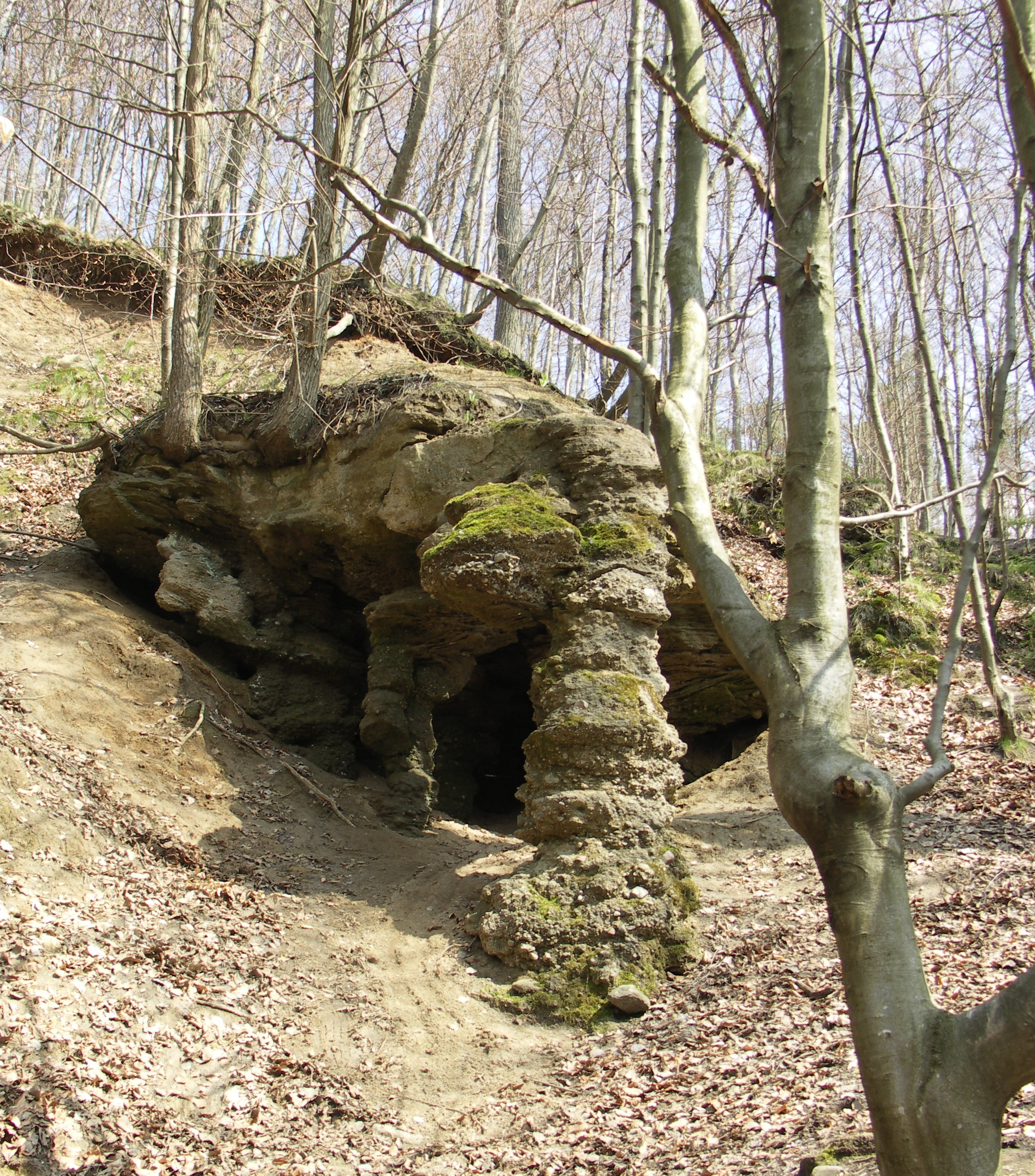
Beech nearby the Lake Lubogoszcz

In terms of geo-botanical classification, the Kashubian Lake District is part of the Pomeranian Lake District in composition with the Kartuski Region. The afforestation rate of the lake district of the Kashubian is quite significant in the comparison to neighbouring mesoregions; apart from the Tuchola Forest. Similarly as in other mesoregions of north-western Poland, lowland beech woods are universal in Pomeranian varieties – fertile and sour; and by the Lake Ostrzycki there are three described types of the Kashubian variety of stenothermic beech wood. The forests in the region are dense. The dominating species of trees, is the European beech (Fagus silvatica), oaks (Quercus robur and Quercus sessilis), hornbeam (Carpinus betulus) and small leaved lime (Tilia cordata). In places, there are riparian species forests in which the lofty ash tree is dominating (Fraxinus exelsior), sycamore (Acer pseudoplatanus) and alder trees (Alnus incana and Alnus glutinosa). Among coniferous trees, the dominating is the Scots pine (Pinus silvestris) and the Norwegian spruce (Picea excelsa), in addition, the last of these kinds appearing in the region outside their natural range, mainly coming from fixing made by man. Forests are covering mainly terrain which is too difficult for farming, for example: hills, river valleys and places in which the soil is too weak for farming. Important plants of the Kashubian Lake District are Ranunculus cassubicus and Vicia cassubica - Kashubian vetch.

== Outline of the history of the region ==
=== Prehistory ===
The oldest signs of mankind in the Kashubian Lake District originate from the older Stone Age. In the Kashubian region, the Sorbian culture settled in the Bronze Age. Many other cultures turned up in the following years, more or less related to themselves, mainly inhabiting the northern part of the region. Being grouped mainly in the vicinity of bodies of water.

=== Middle Ages ===
In the early Middle Ages, the lake district and neighbouring regions were ruled by the Duchy of Pomerania, which in 1294 as a result of the Union in Kępno joined to the Kingdom of Poland. Areas of the lake district became in close vicinity of Gdańsk. Later a period of battles had enrolled over Pomerania, causing losses in the economy in areas of the lake district. Gdańsk however caused the region to be dominated by agriculture, which was centered around the north-east of the mesoregion.

=== From the Renaissance to the newest times ===
After the Middle Ages kept changing owners, which had a big impact on development of the region. The temporary detachment from Poland and from Germany caused the development of the region's own culture and the language, however Kashubians didn't create their own state.

=== The years 1918–1945 ===
In the interwar period, the region belonged to Poland however the residents of the Kashubian Lake District (Kashubians), tied quite firmly, mentally and economically, to then the Free City of Gdańsk, having articles of association with the free city. Additionally, the western part of the mesoregion, which at that time was part of Germany, caused economic problems for the citizens which could not freely travel across the border. The region as also impoverished, as there was no other income to the region other than agriculture. A railway line linking the region to Gdynia was built, the city's station had direct railway connections to the mining region of Silesia. However, the structure of this line caused not only a momentary fall in unemployment but had successfully also created chances for the development of this area, also developing tourism.

=== After 1945 ===
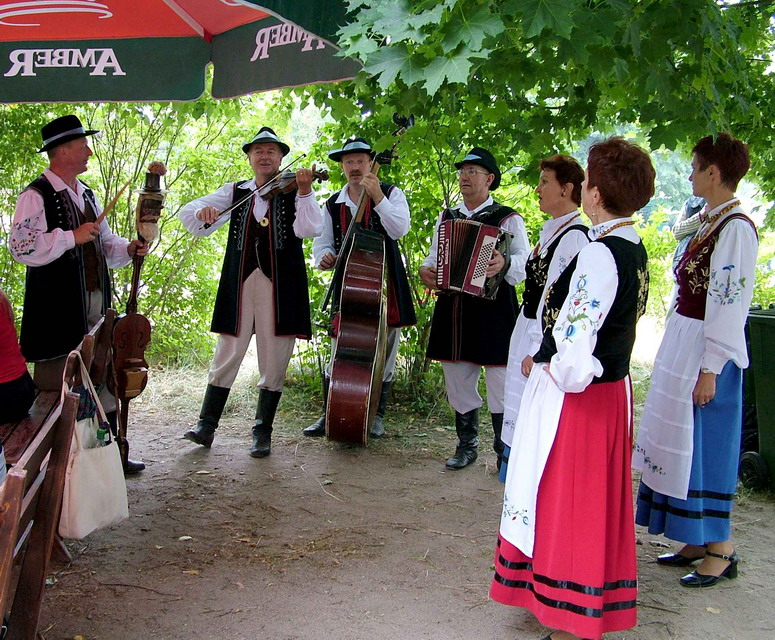
Folklore band in traditional Kashubian clothes

After 1945, Gdańsk was incorporated into Poland. Additionally, in a quite rapid pace a shipbuilding industry started growing, this caused many people to migrate from the region and into the Tricity. In the 1960s, a large amount tourism started developing intensively, allowing the region to become a rich region, particularly in the Kartuzy region – the poorest district was the Gdańsk region. In the 1970s, Gdańsk and Gdynia's city limits had expanded into the region. After the political transformation, tourist movements had diminished, additionally a large quantity of big industrial plants had closed down – impoverishing the population; causing an increase of the population to come back to agriculture. When Poland had entered the European Union, this caused both financial benefits (EU funds for the development of the region) as well as an increase in the cultural diversity in the region, as many Kashubian institutions, and the Kashubian language was declared an official language – which was not possible during the times of the Polish People's Republic.
