= Bąk railway station =

Railway station in Gmina Stara Kiszewa, Poland

Coordinates: 53°57′N 18°02′E

Bąk
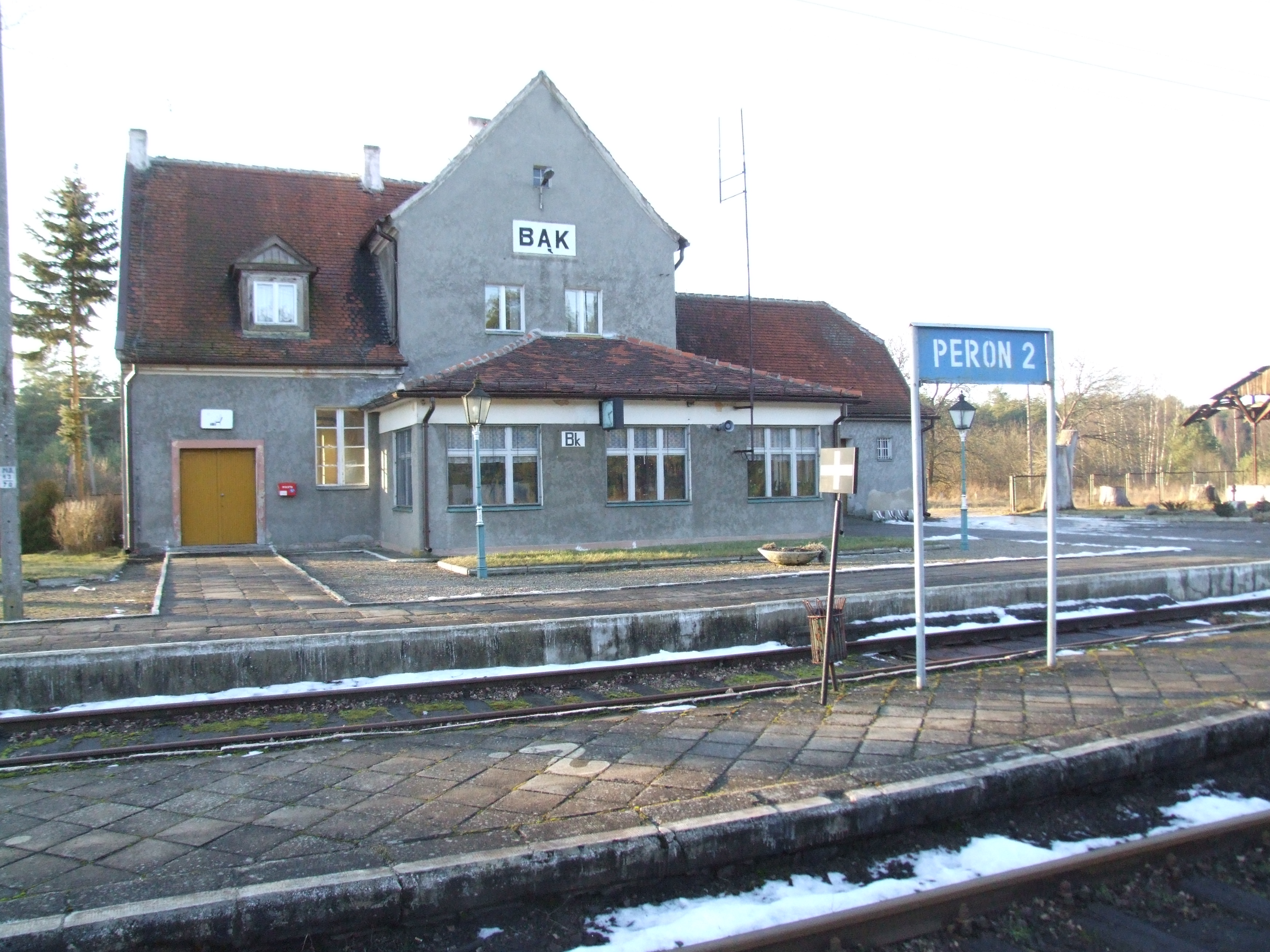

General information
- Location: Bąk, Pomeranian Voivodeship; Poland
- Owner: Polish State Railways
- Platforms: 3

History
- Former names: Bonk
Location

Bąk is a railway station in Bąk, Kościerzyna County within the Pomeranian Voivodeship in northern Poland.

== Lines ==
| Start station | End station | Traffic |
|---|---|---|
| Nowa Wieś Wielka | Gdynia Port Centralny | Passenger/Freight |
| Laskowice Pomorskie | Bąk | Passenger/Freight |
