= Nowe Polaszki =

- Village
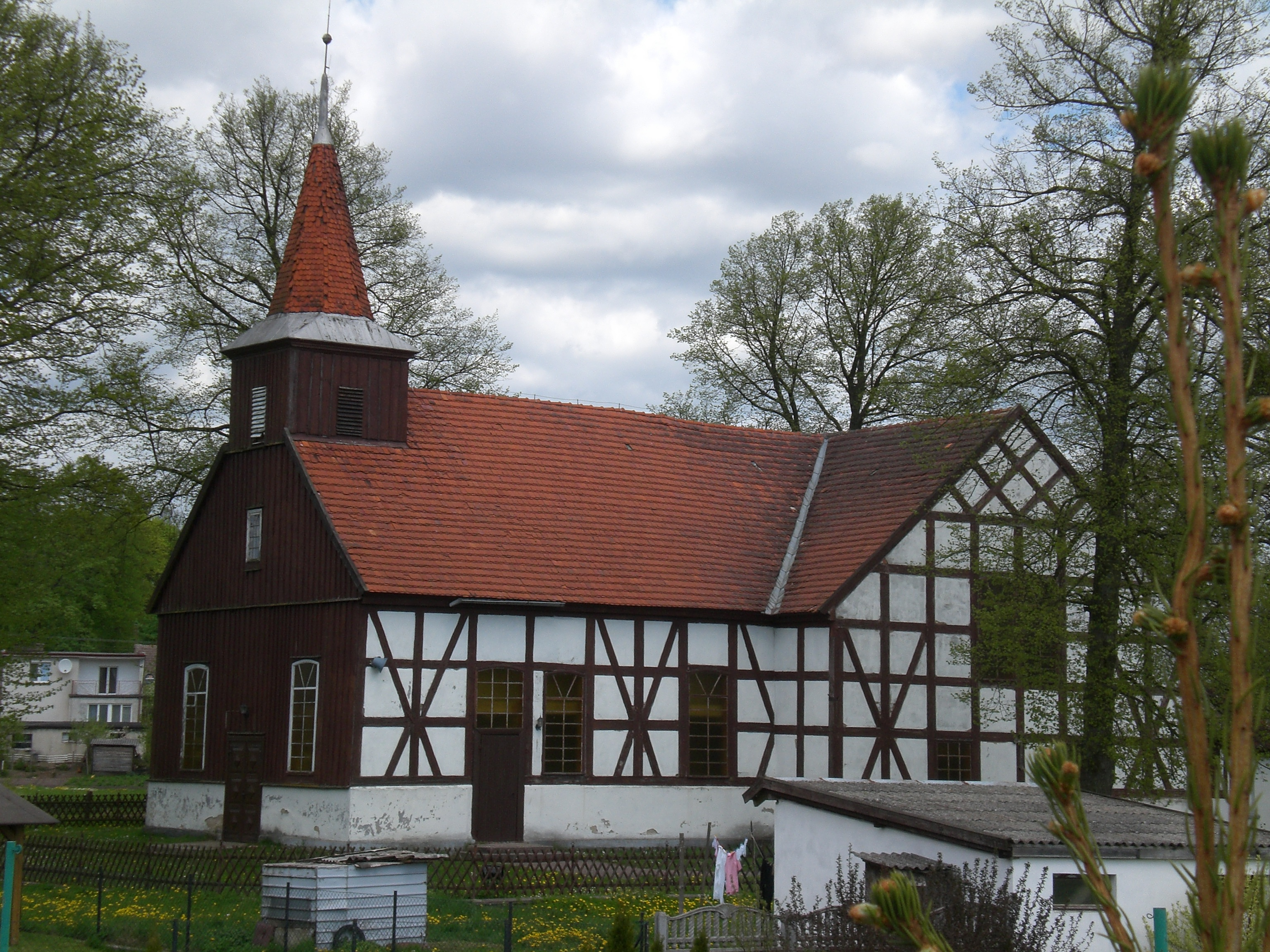
- Church of the Immaculate Heart of Mary in Nowe Polaszki

- Location within Poland
- Coordinates: 54°1′55″N 18°8′8″E
- Country: Poland
- Voivodeship: Pomeranian
- County: Kościerzyna
- Gmina: Stara Kiszewa
- Population: 460
- Time zone: UTC+1 (CET)
  - Summer (DST): UTC+2 (CEST)

Nowe Polaszki [ˈnɔvɛ pɔˈlaʂki] is a village in the administrative district of Gmina Stara Kiszewa, within Kościerzyna County, Pomeranian Voivodeship, in northern Poland. It is located within the historic region of Pomerania.

The settlement Warszawa is part of the village.

Nowe Polaszki was a royal village of the Polish Crown, administratively located in the Tczew County in the Pomeranian Voivodeship.

During the German occupation of Poland (World War II), in 1939, several Polish families were expelled from the village to the transit camp in Wysin and afterwards to the General Government.
