= Kiszewski Castle =

Castle in Zamek Kiszewski, Poland

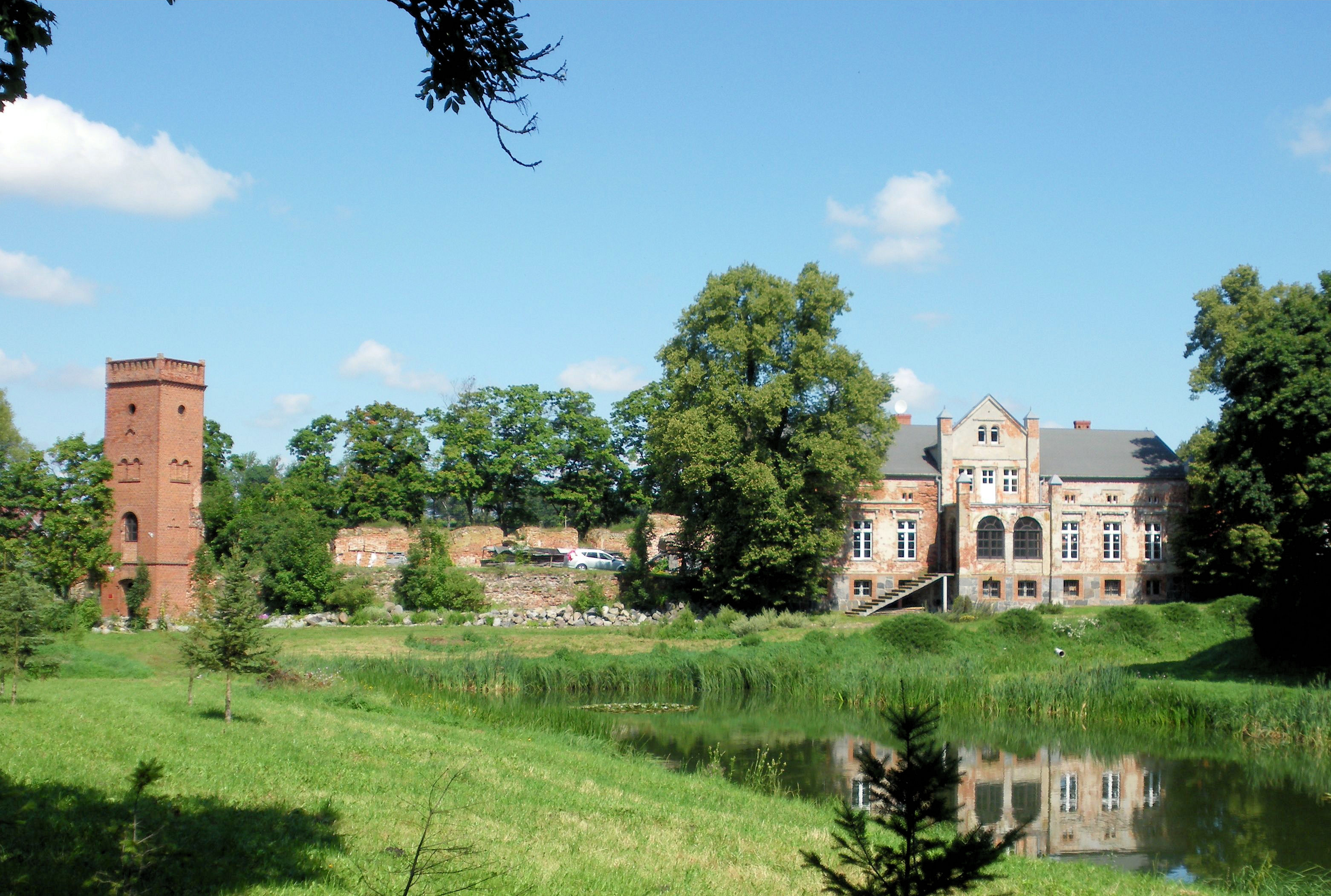
View of the manor inside of Kiszewski Castle

The Kisezewski Castle is a brick castle, built by the Teutonic Order around 1350 A.D, located on a small peninsula on the Wierzyca River in the town of Zamek Kiszewski.

== History ==
=== State of the Teutonic Order ===
Before the Teutonic Order the castle was an old wooden fortress built around the 11th century, however in 1090, the stronghold was destroyed Władysław Herman possibly during his military campaign to regain control of Pomerania. In 1316 A.D, the Teutonic Order invaded Zamek Kiszewski and took it from Jakub von Kalisch. Around 1350 A.D, the castle was constructed by the Teutonic Order. The castle's soul purpose was to protect Pomerania from Polish invaders and played a key element in the Teutonic Order's defense of Pomerania.

=== Thirteen Year's War ===
In 1454, a Gdańsk army captured the castle during the Thirteen Years' War and partially destroyed. On August 3, 1459, the Teutonic Order recaptured the castle and held it until 1466 after the Second Peace of Thorn the castle was passed in Polish hands.

=== Modern Day ===
After the castle was passed into Polish hands in 1466, it became a Starostwo. It became a symbol of Polish power and the incorporation of former Teutonic territories into the polish crown. In 1655, a Swedish army captured the castle during the Swedish Deluge. In 1772 the village and castle came under Prussian Rule, in the mid-19th century a Prussian administrator Joachim Engler bought the estate and built a Neoclassical manor at the foot of the castle. After World War II, in 1945 the castle became the property of state treasury. The Commune divided the land, which led to the gradual destruction of the historical buildings. In 1990 the castle was sold to a private citizen as compensation, however in 1997 the castle was bought by Piotr Tudjai, who undertook restoration of the castle. As of 2026, the castle is owned by a private citizen and is open to visitors.
