= Dolne Maliki =

- Village
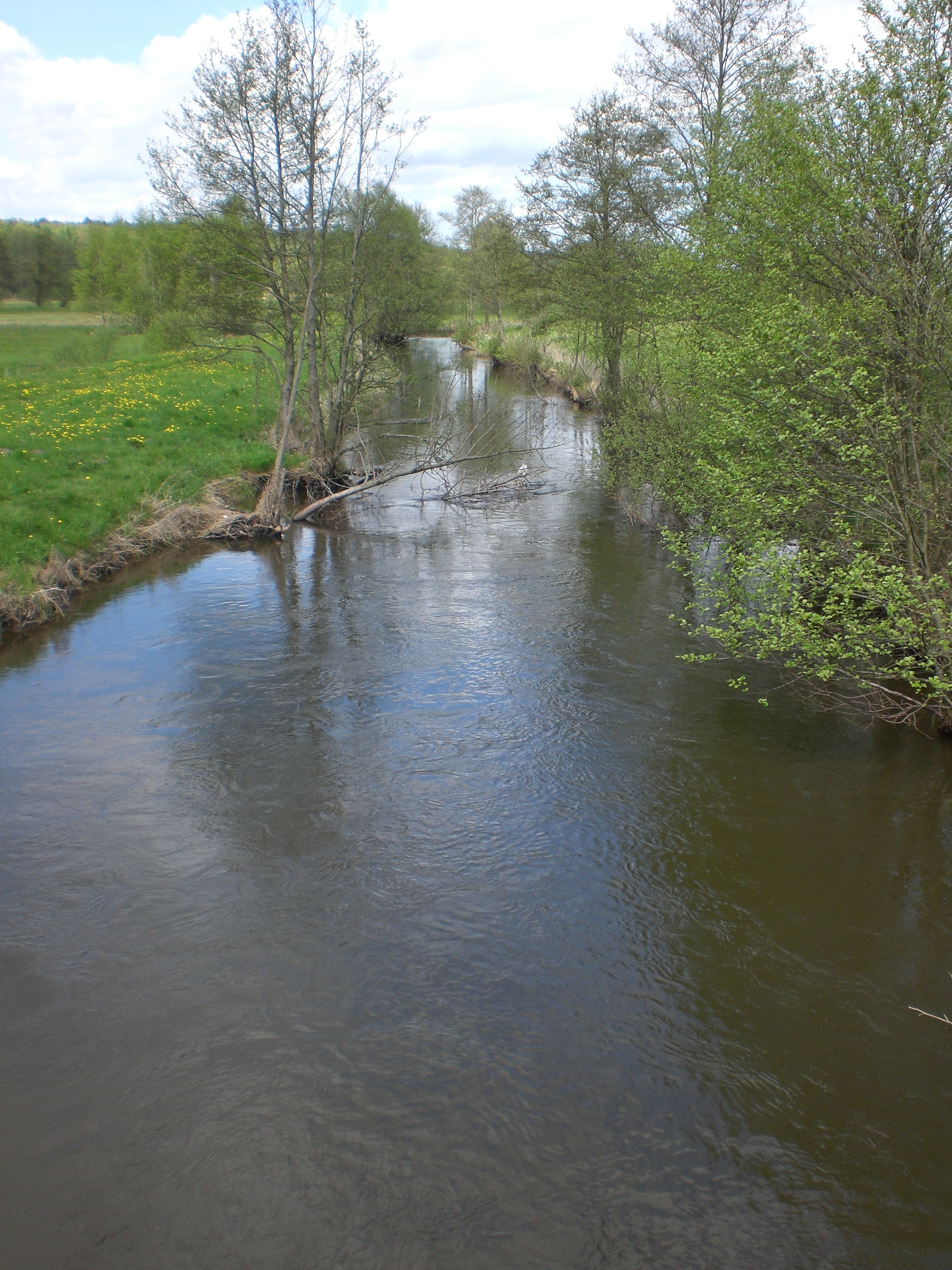
- Wierzyca river near Dolne Maliki

- Location within Poland
- Coordinates: 53°59′44″N 18°15′50″E
- Country: Poland
- Voivodeship: Pomeranian
- County: Kościerzyna
- Gmina: Stara Kiszewa
- Population (2022): 153
- Time zone: UTC+1 (CET)
  - Summer (DST): UTC+2 (CEST)

Dolne Maliki [ˈdɔlnɛ maˈliki] is a village in the administrative district of Gmina Stara Kiszewa, within Kościerzyna County, Pomeranian Voivodeship, in northern Poland. It is located within the historic region of Pomerania.

Maliki was a royal village of the Polish Crown, administratively located in the Tczew County in the Pomeranian Voivodeship. Maliki is now divided into two villages: Dolne Maliki ("Lower Maliki") and Górne Maliki ("Upper Maliki").
