= Madera, Pomeranian Voivodeship =

Madera
- Settlement
- Location within Poland
- Coordinates: 53°58′28″N 18°5′37″E
- Country: Poland
- Voivodeship: Pomeranian
- County: Kościerzyna
- Gmina: Stara Kiszewa

Madera [maˈdɛra] is a settlement in the administrative district of Gmina Stara Kiszewa, within Kościerzyna County, Pomeranian Voivodeship, in northern Poland.

For details of the history of the region, see History of Pomerania.
