= Kobyle, Pomeranian Voivodeship =

Kobyle
- Village
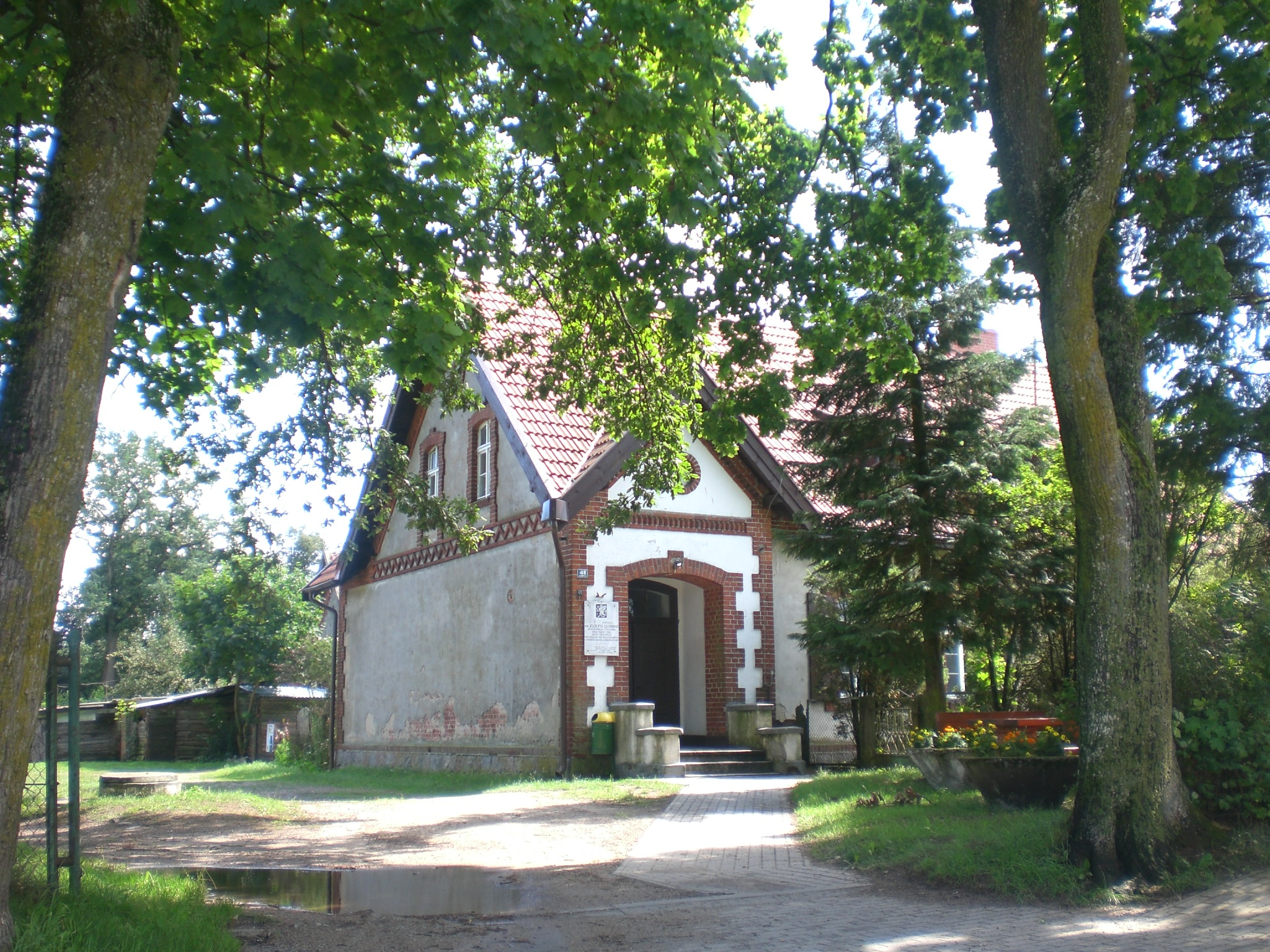

- Location within Poland
- Coordinates: 54°0′49″N 18°16′3″E
- Country: Poland
- Voivodeship: Pomeranian
- County: Kościerzyna
- Gmina: Stara Kiszewa
- Population: 283
- Time zone: UTC+1 (CET)
  - Summer (DST): UTC+2 (CEST)
- Vehicle registration: GKS

Kobyle [kɔˈbɨlɛ] is a village in the administrative district of Gmina Stara Kiszewa, within Kościerzyna County, Pomeranian Voivodeship, in northern Poland. It is located within the historic region of Pomerania.

== History ==
Kobyle was a private church village of the monastery in Pelplin, administratively located in the Tczew County in the Pomeranian Voivodeship of the Polish Crown.

During the German occupation of Poland (World War II), Kobyle was one of the sites of executions of Poles, carried out by the Germans in 1939 as part of the Intelligenzaktion.
