= Nowy Dworzec =

- Settlement
- Location within Poland
- Coordinates: 53°59′32″N 18°18′38″E
- Country: Poland
- Voivodeship: Pomeranian
- County: Kościerzyna
- Gmina: Stara Kiszewa

Nowy Dworzec [ˈnɔvɨ ˈdvɔʐɛt͡s] is a settlement in the administrative district of Gmina Stara Kiszewa, within Kościerzyna County, Pomeranian Voivodeship, in northern Poland.
