= Bartoszylas =

- Village

- Location within Poland
- Coordinates: 53°59′27″N 18°6′2″E
- Country: Poland
- Voivodeship: Pomeranian
- County: Kościerzyna
- Gmina: Stara Kiszewa
- Population (2022): 173

Bartoszylas [bartɔˈʂɨlas] is a village in the administrative district of Gmina Stara Kiszewa, within Kościerzyna County, Pomeranian Voivodeship, in northern Poland.

For details of the history of the region, see History of Pomerania.
