= Nowy Bukowiec, Kościerzyna County =

Nowy Bukowiec
- Village
- Location within Poland
- Coordinates: 54°1′44″N 18°4′37″E
- Country: Poland
- Voivodeship: Pomeranian
- County: Kościerzyna
- Gmina: Stara Kiszewa
- Population: 72

Nowy Bukowiec [ˈnɔvɨ buˈkɔvjɛt͡s] is a village in the administrative district of Gmina Stara Kiszewa, within Kościerzyna County, Pomeranian Voivodeship, in northern Poland.

== See also ==
- History of Pomerania
