= Kozia, Pomeranian Voivodeship =

Kozia
- Settlement
- Location within Poland
- Coordinates: 53°58′35″N 18°10′2″E
- Country: Poland
- Voivodeship: Pomeranian
- County: Kościerzyna
- Gmina: Stara Kiszewa

Kozia [ˈkɔʑa] is a settlement in the administrative district of Gmina Stara Kiszewa, within Kościerzyna County, Pomeranian Voivodeship, in northern Poland.

For details of the history of the region, see History of Pomerania.
