= Gmina Stara Kiszewa =

Gmina Stara Kiszewa Stara Kiszewa Commune
- Gmina
- Coat of arms

- Coordinates (Stara Kiszewa): 53°59′24″N 18°10′9″E
- Country: Poland
- Voivodeship: Pomeranian
- County: Kościerzyna
- Seat: Stara Kiszewa

Area
  - Total: 213.1 km^{2} (82.3 sq mi)

Population (2022)
  - Total: 6,776
  - Density: 31.80/km^{2} (82.35/sq mi)
- Website: http://www.starakiszewa.pl

Gmina Stara Kiszewa is a rural gmina (administrative district) in Kościerzyna County, Pomeranian Voivodeship, in northern Poland. Its seat is the village of Stara Kiszewa, which lies approximately 19 kilometres (12 mi) south-east of Kościerzyna and 52 km (32 mi) south-west of the regional capital Gdańsk.

The gmina covers an area of 213.1 square kilometres (82.3 sq mi); as of 2022, its total population is 6,776.

The gmina contains part of the protected area called Wdydze Landscape Park.

== Villages ==
Gmina Stara Kiszewa contains the villages and settlements of Bąk, Bartoszylas, Bestra Suka, Bożepole Szlacheckie, Chrósty, Chwarzenko, Chwarzno, Cięgardło, Czerniki, Dolne Maliki, Drzewiny, Dubryk, Foshuta, Góra, Górne Maliki, Grzybno, Hamerbark, Kalk, Kobyle, Konarzyny, Kozia, Łasinek, Lipy, Lisia Huta, Madera, Nowe Polaszki, Nowiny, Nowy Bukowiec, Nowy Dworzec, Olpuch, Olpuch-Dworzec, Pałubin, Pikowo, Portygała, Ruda, Stara Kiszewa, Stare Polaszki, Stary Bukowiec, Struga, Strzelki, Tramkule, Warszawa, Wilcze Błota Kościerskie, Wygonin, Zamek Kiszewski and Zomrze.

== Neighbouring gminas ==
Gmina Stara Kiszewa is bordered by the gminas of Czersk, Kaliska, Karsin, Kościerzyna, Liniewo, Skarszewy and Zblewo.
