= Chrósty, Pomeranian Voivodeship =

Chrósty
- Village
- Location within Poland
- Coordinates: 54°3′0″N 18°10′3″E
- Country: Poland
- Voivodeship: Pomeranian
- County: Kościerzyna
- Gmina: Stara Kiszewa

Chrósty [ˈxrustɨ] is a village in the administrative district of Gmina Stara Kiszewa, within Kościerzyna County, Pomeranian Voivodeship, in northern Poland.

For details of the history of the region, see History of Pomerania.
