= Bestra Suka =

- Village
- Location within Poland
- Coordinates: 54°1′14″N 18°2′7″E
- Country: Poland
- Voivodeship: Pomeranian
- County: Kościerzyna
- Gmina: Stara Kiszewa
- Population: 30

Bestra Suka [ˈbɛstra ˈsuka] is a village in the administrative district of Gmina Stara Kiszewa, within Kościerzyna County, Pomeranian Voivodeship, in northern Poland.

For details of the history of the region, see History of Pomerania.
