= Olpuch-Dworzec =

- Settlement
- Location within Poland
- Coordinates: 54°0′25″N 18°1′17″E
- Country: Poland
- Voivodeship: Pomeranian
- County: Kościerzyna
- Gmina: Stara Kiszewa

Olpuch-Dworzec [ˈɔlpux ˈdvɔʐɛt͡s] is a settlement in the administrative district of Gmina Stara Kiszewa, Kościerzyna County, Pomeranian Voivodeship, in northern Poland.

== History ==
For details of the history of the region, see History of Pomerania.
