= Wygonin =

- Village
- Location within Poland
- Coordinates: 53°57′33″N 18°7′35″E
- Country: Poland
- Voivodeship: Pomeranian
- County: Kościerzyna
- Gmina: Stara Kiszewa
- Elevation: 134 m (440 ft)
- Population: 40

Wygonin [vɨˈɡɔnin] is a village in the administrative district of Gmina Stara Kiszewa, within Kościerzyna County, Pomeranian Voivodeship, in northern Poland.

For details of the history of the region, see History of Pomerania.
