= Bożepole Szlacheckie =

- Village
- Location within Poland
- Coordinates: 53°58′38″N 18°13′42″E
- Country: Poland
- Voivodeship: Pomeranian
- County: Kościerzyna
- Gmina: Stara Kiszewa
- Population (2022): 107

Bożepole Szlacheckie [bɔʐɛˈpɔlɛ ʂlaˈxɛt͡skʲɛ] is a village in the administrative district of Gmina Stara Kiszewa, within Kościerzyna County, Pomeranian Voivodeship, in northern Poland.

For details of the history of the region, see History of Pomerania.
