= Zomrze =

- Settlement
- Location within Poland
- Coordinates: 53°57′8″N 18°14′9″E
- Country: Poland
- Voivodeship: Pomeranian
- County: Kościerzyna
- Gmina: Stara Kiszewa

Zomrze [ˈzɔmʐɛ] is a settlement in the administrative district of Gmina Stara Kiszewa, within Kościerzyna County, Pomeranian Voivodeship, in northern Poland.

For details of the history of the region, see History of Pomerania.
