= Stary Bukowiec, Pomeranian Voivodeship =

Stary Bukowiec
- Village
- Location within Poland
- Coordinates: 54°0′52″N 18°4′57″E
- Country: Poland
- Voivodeship: Pomeranian
- County: Kościerzyna
- Gmina: Stara Kiszewa
- Population: 307

Stary Bukowiec [ˈstarɨ buˈkɔvjɛt͡s] is a village in the administrative district of Gmina Stara Kiszewa, within Kościerzyna County, Pomeranian Voivodeship, in northern Poland.

For details of the history of the region, see History of Pomerania.
