= Konarzyny, Kościerzyna County =

Konarzyny
- Village
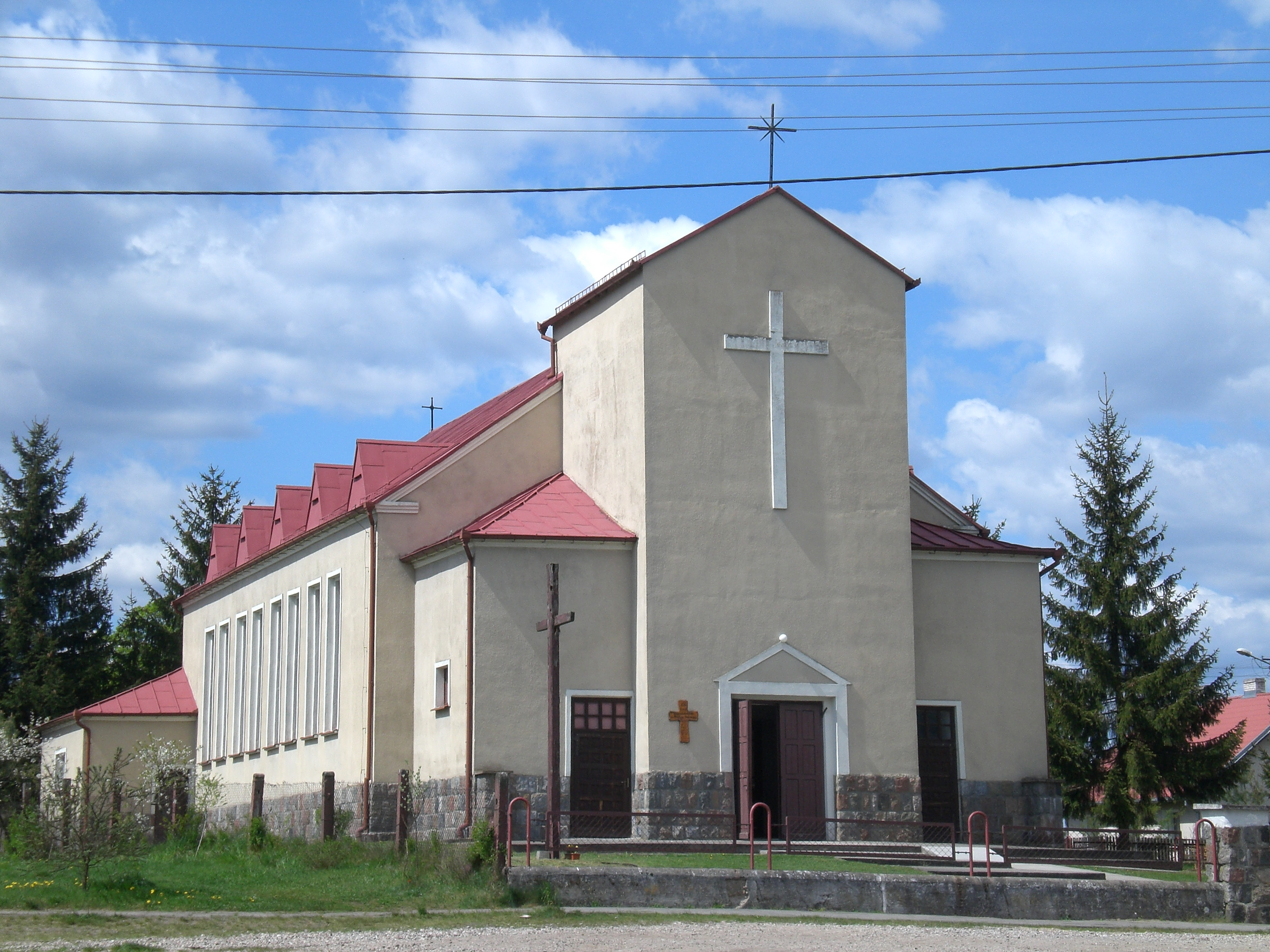

- Location within Poland
- Coordinates: 53°58′3″N 18°5′12″E
- Country: Poland
- Voivodeship: Pomeranian
- County: Kościerzyna
- Gmina: Stara Kiszewa
- Population: 443

Konarzyny [kɔnaˈʐɨnɨ] is a village in the administrative district of Gmina Stara Kiszewa, within Kościerzyna County, Pomeranian Voivodeship, in northern Poland.

For details of the history of the region, see History of Pomerania.
