= Kalk, Poland =

Kalk
- Settlement
- Location within Poland
- Coordinates: 53°59′4″N 18°8′31″E
- Country: Poland
- Voivodeship: Pomeranian
- County: Kościerzyna
- Gmina: Stara Kiszewa

Kalk [kalk] is a settlement in the administrative district of Gmina Stara Kiszewa, within Kościerzyna County, Pomeranian Voivodeship, in northern Poland.

For details of the history of the region, see History of Pomerania.
