= Struga, Kościerzyna County =

Village in Kociewie

Struga
- Settlement
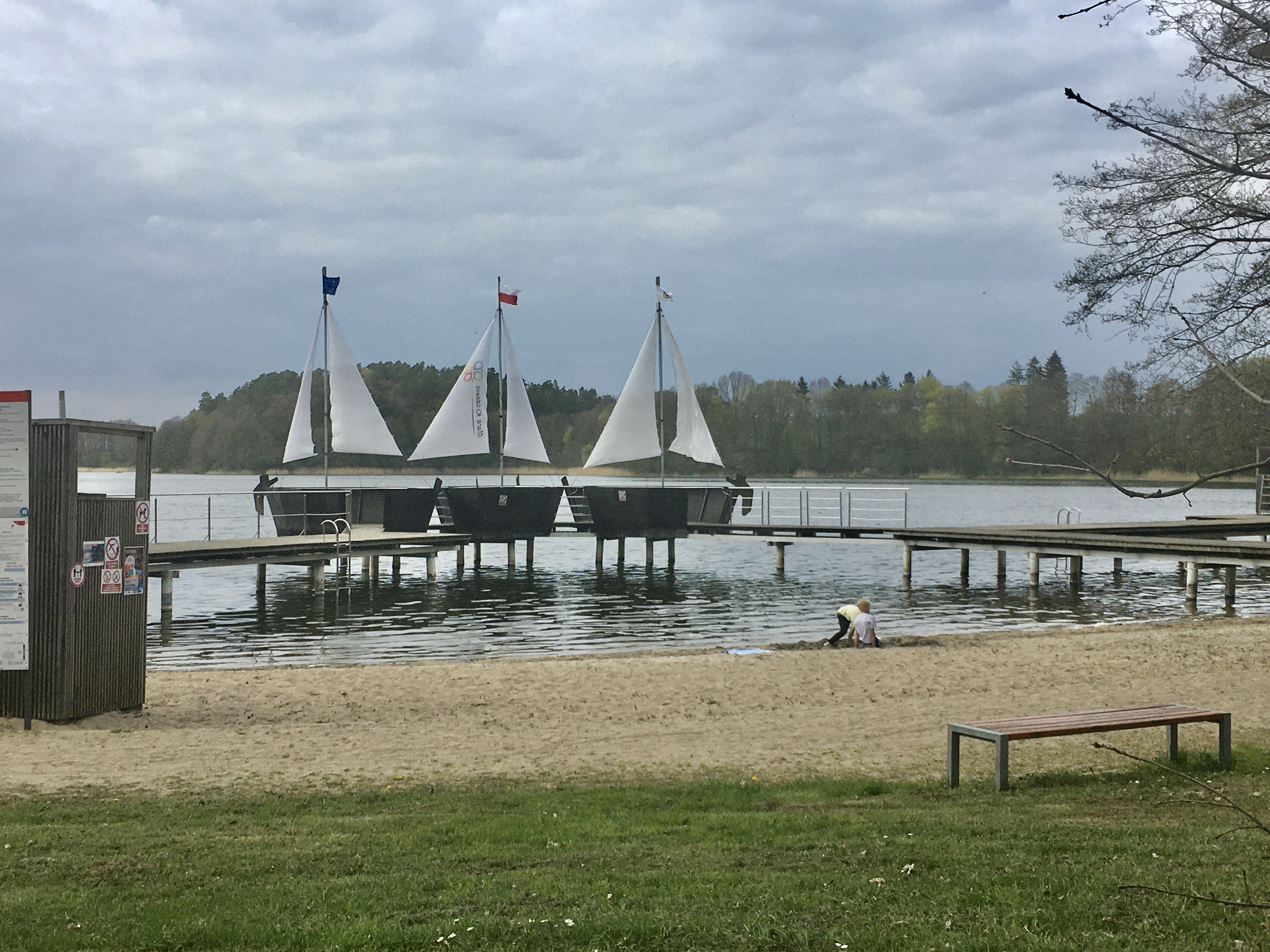

- Location within Poland
- Coordinates: 53°58′6″N 18°15′46″E
- Country: Poland
- Voivodeship: Pomeranian
- County: Kościerzyna
- Gmina: Stara Kiszewa

Struga ([ˈstruɡa]; German: Struga, 1942–45 Bachlin) is a settlement in the administrative district of Gmina Stara Kiszewa, within Kościerzyna County, Pomeranian Voivodeship, in northern Poland.

For details of the history of the region, see History of Pomerania.
