= Pikowo =

- Settlement
- Location within Poland
- Coordinates: 53°57′39″N 18°2′59″E
- Country: Poland
- Voivodeship: Pomeranian
- County: Kościerzyna
- Gmina: Stara Kiszewa
- Population: 10

Pikowo [piˈkɔvɔ] is a settlement in the administrative district of Gmina Stara Kiszewa, within Kościerzyna County, Pomeranian Voivodeship, in northern Poland.

For details of the history of the region, see History of Pomerania.
