= Cięgardło =

- Hamlet
- Location within Poland
- Coordinates: 53°59′25″N 18°2′43″E
- Country: Poland
- Voivodeship: Pomeranian
- County: Kościerzyna
- Gmina: Stara Kiszewa
- Population (2022): 176

Cięgardło [t͡ɕɛnˈɡardwɔ] is a hamlet in the administrative district of Gmina Stara Kiszewa, within Kościerzyna County, Pomeranian Voivodeship, in northern Poland.

For details of the history of the region, see History of Pomerania.
