= Górne Maliki =

- Village
- Location within Poland
- Coordinates: 53°59′24″N 18°15′25″E
- Country: Poland
- Voivodeship: Pomeranian
- County: Kościerzyna
- Gmina: Stara Kiszewa
- Population: 110
- Time zone: UTC+1 (CET)
  - Summer (DST): UTC+2 (CEST)

Górne Maliki [ˈɡurnɛ maˈliki] is a village in the administrative district of Gmina Stara Kiszewa, within Kościerzyna County, Pomeranian Voivodeship, in northern Poland. It is located within the historic region of Pomerania.

Maliki was a royal village of the Polish Crown, administratively located in the Tczew County in the Pomeranian Voivodeship. Maliki is now divided into two villages: Górne Maliki ("Upper Maliki") and Dolne Maliki ("Lower Maliki").

During the German occupation of Poland (World War II), in 1939 and 1942, the Germans expelled several Polish families from the village, whose farms were then handed over to Germans as part of the Lebensraum policy.
