= Ruda, Pomeranian Voivodeship =

Ruda
- Settlement
- Location within Poland
- Coordinates: 53°59′45″N 18°4′50″E
- Country: Poland
- Voivodeship: Pomeranian
- County: Kościerzyna
- Gmina: Stara Kiszewa
- ZIP Code: 83-430
- Vehicle registration: GKS

Ruda [ˈruda] is a settlement in the administrative district of Gmina Stara Kiszewa, within Kościerzyna County, Pomeranian Voivodeship, in northern Poland.

For details of the history of the region, see History of Pomerania.
