= Wierzyca =

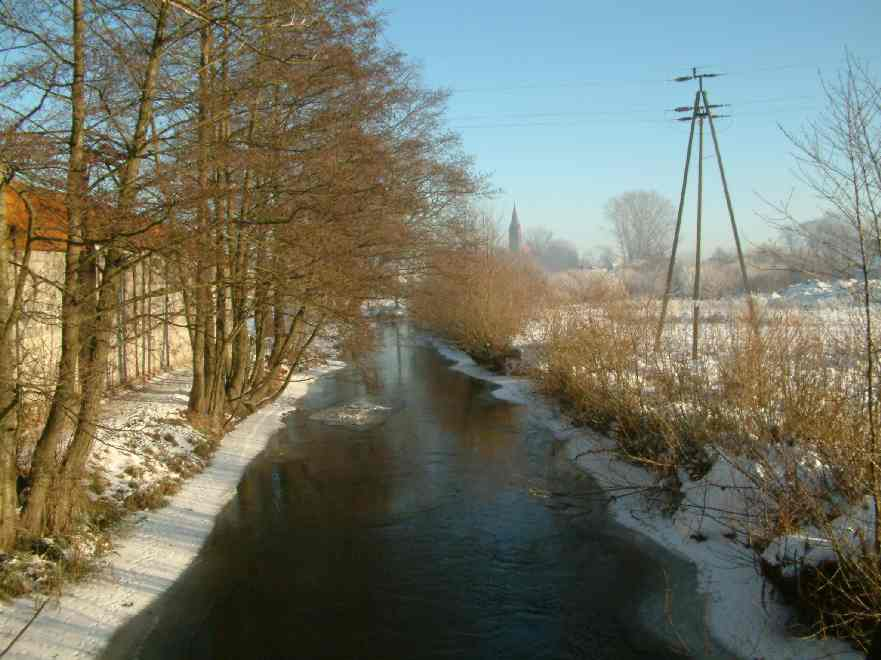
- Wierzyca in Stara Kiszewa
- Native name: Ferza

Location
- Country: Poland
- Voivodeship: Pomeranian

Physical characteristics
- Source: Lake Piotrowskie
  - location: northern lakeshore, east of Piotrowo, Kartuzy County
  - coordinates: 54°11′25″N 18°09′11″E
- Mouth: Vistula
  - location: Gniew, Tczew County
  - coordinates: 53°49′55″N 18°50′10″E
- Length: 151.4 km (94.1 mi)
- Basin size: 1,603 km^{2} (619 mi^{2})
- Discharge
  - average: 8.94 m^{3}/s (316 cu ft/s) near Brody Pomorskie, Tczew County

Basin features
- Progression: Vistula→ Baltic Sea
- Tributaries
  - left: Mała Wierzyca; Wietcisa
  - right: Węgiermuca; Piesienica

The Wierzyca (Kocievian: Ferza) is a river of Poland, and a tributary of the Vistula, which it joins at Gniew. The Wierzyca's own tributaries include the Mała Wierzyca.

== See also ==
- Mała Wierzyca
