= Stare Polaszki =

- Village
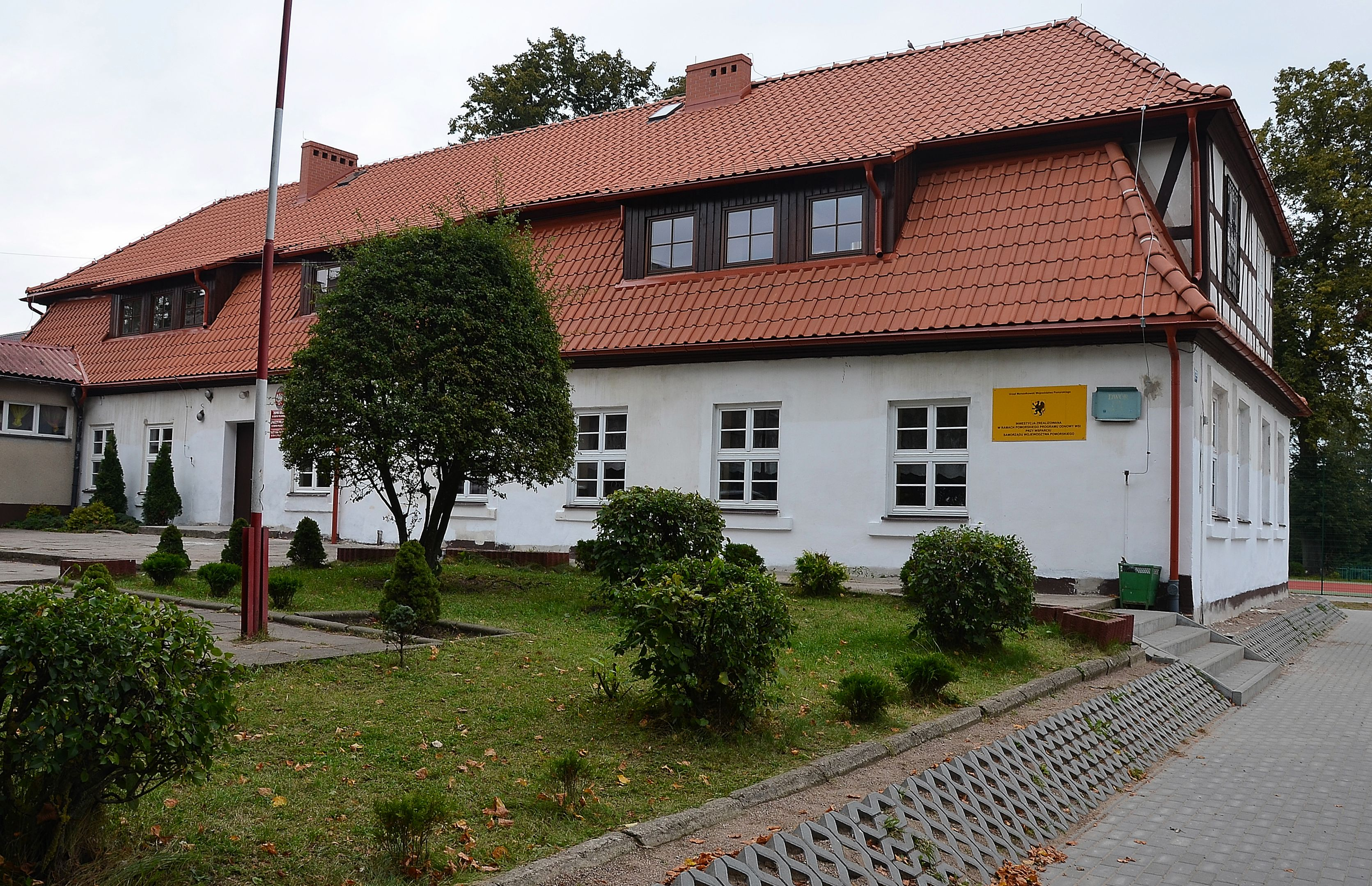
- Skórzewski Manor in Stare Polaszki

- Location within Poland
- Coordinates: 54°1′41″N 18°11′45″E
- Country: Poland
- Voivodeship: Pomeranian
- County: Kościerzyna
- Gmina: Stara Kiszewa
- Population: 462
- Time zone: UTC+1 (CET)
  - Summer (DST): UTC+2 (CEST)

Stare Polaszki [ˈstarɛ pɔˈlaʂki] is a village in the administrative district of Gmina Stara Kiszewa, within Kościerzyna County, Pomeranian Voivodeship, in northern Poland. It is located within the historic region of Pomerania.

== History ==
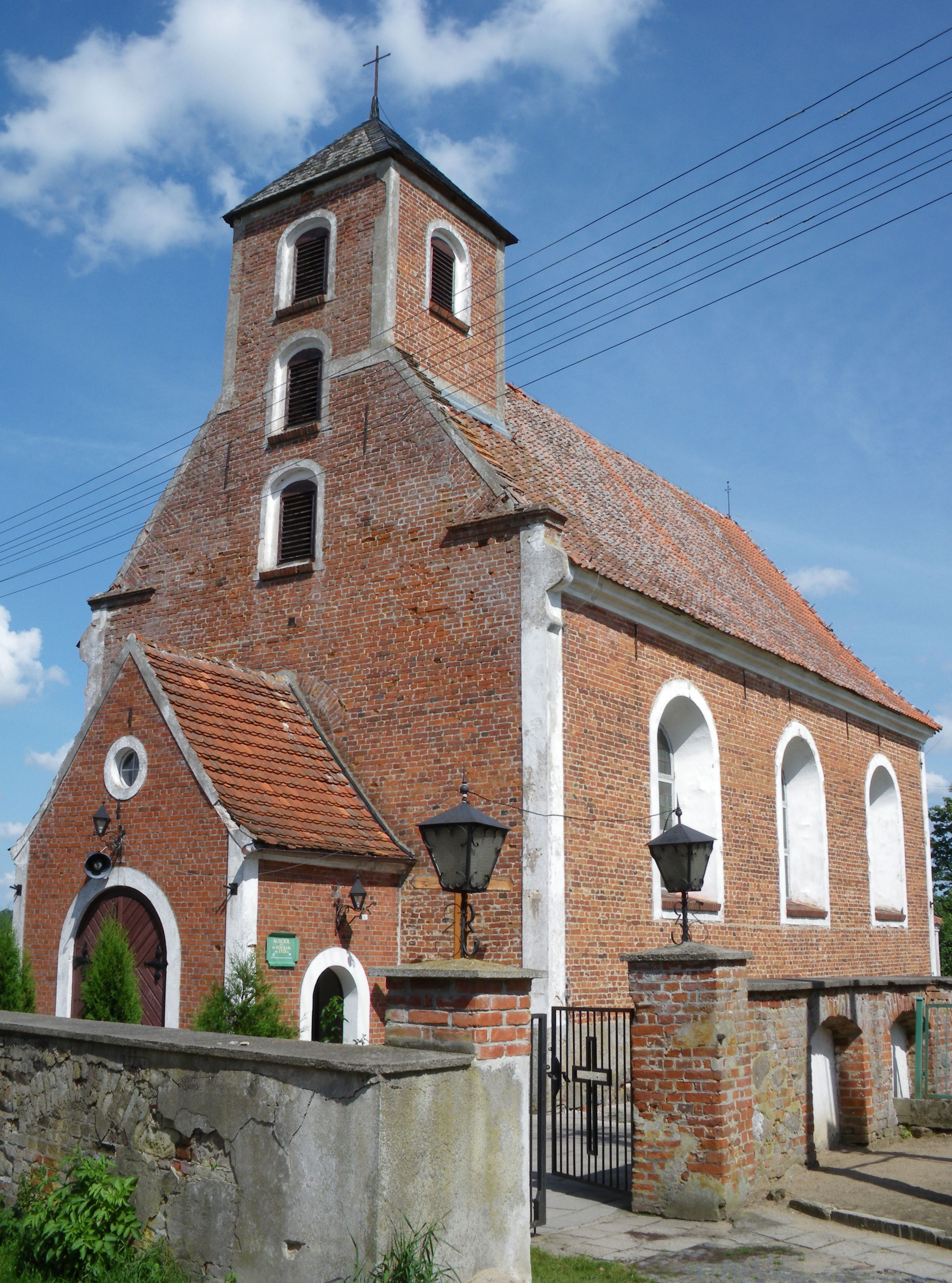
Saint Nicholas church

Stare Polaszki is an old village, in which a pagan cemetery was discovered in the 19th century. In 1289 Duke Mestwin II granted Polaszki to Cistercians from Byszewo. Later on, Stare Polaszki was a royal village of the Polish Crown, administratively located in the Tczew County in the Pomeranian Voivodeship. A wooden church of Saint Nicholas is mentioned in a document of Kuyavian Bishop Bonawentura Madaliński from 1686. In the 18th century the Skórzewski Polish noble family lived in Stare Polaszki, and in 1754 Stanisław Skórzewski and his wife Katarzyna Skórzewska founded a new brick church of Saint Nicholas.

During the German occupation of Poland (World War II), many Polish families were in 1939, 1942 and 1943 expelled to the General Government, and some people were sent to forced labour, while their farms were handed over to Germans as part of the Lebensraum policy.
