= Stara Kiszewa =

- Village
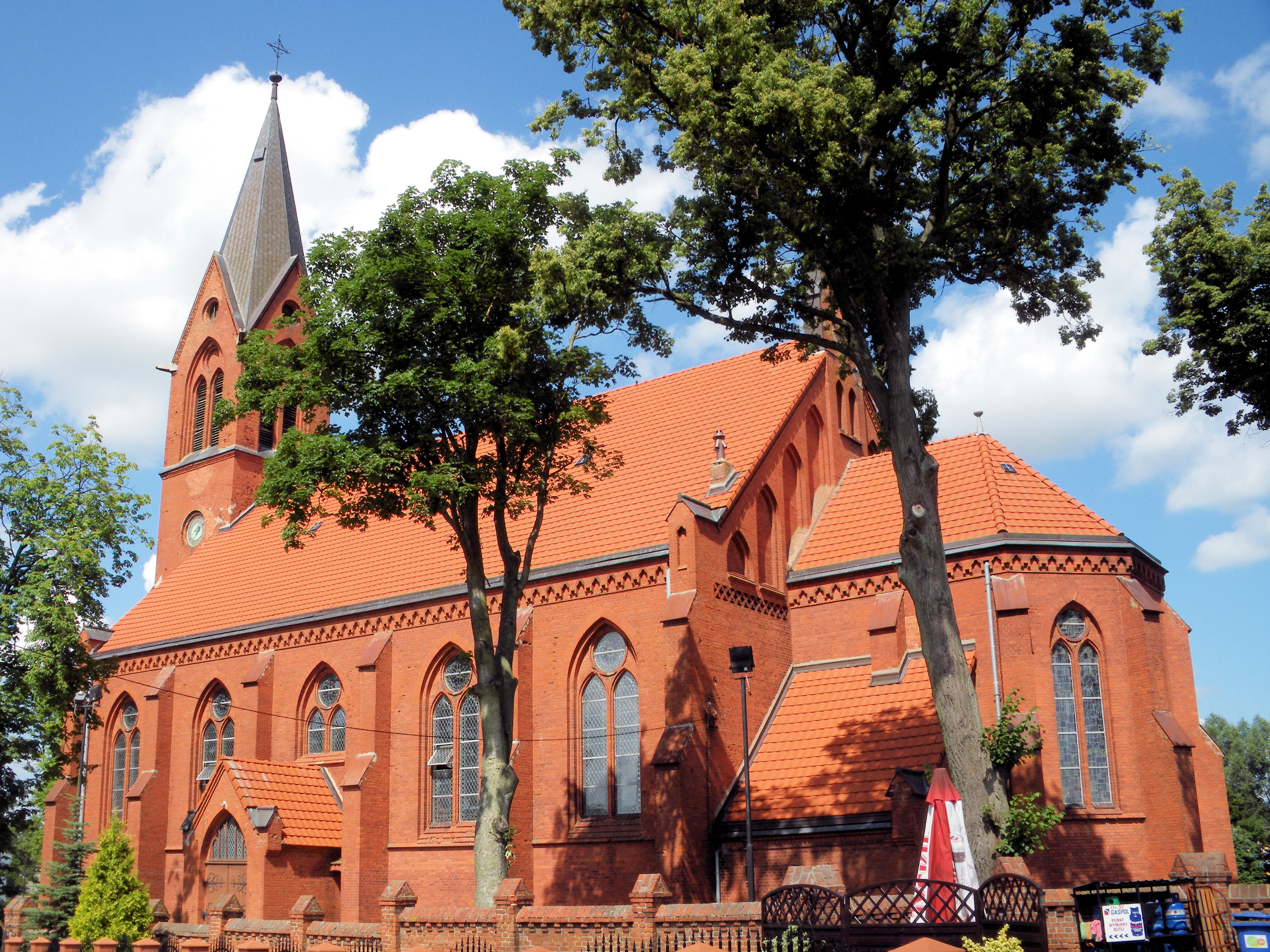
- Saint Martin Church

- Location within Poland
- Coordinates: 53°59′24″N 18°10′9″E
- Country: Poland
- Voivodeship: Pomeranian
- County: Kościerzyna
- Gmina: Stara Kiszewa
- Elevation: 117.5 m (385 ft)

Population
  - Total: 1,480
- Time zone: UTC+1 (CET)
  - Summer (DST): UTC+2 (CEST)
- Vehicle registration: GKS

Stara Kiszewa [ˈstara kiˈʂɛva] is a village in Kościerzyna County, Pomeranian Voivodeship, in northern Poland. It is the seat of the gmina (administrative district) called Gmina Stara Kiszewa. It is located within the historic region of Pomerania.

== History ==
Stara Kiszewa was a royal village of the Kingdom of Poland, administratively located in the Tczew County in the Pomeranian Voivodeship.

During the German occupation of Poland (World War II), on November 19, 1939, the Germans murdered 12 Polish farmers from Stara Kiszewa in a massacre in the nearby village Nowy Wiec. Poles were also subjected to expulsions, carried out in late 1939, January 1940 and in 1942. In August 1941, two Poles escaped from a subcamp of the Stutthof concentration camp in Gdańsk to Stara Kiszewa and received aid in the village.
