= Bąk, Gmina Stara Kiszewa =

Bąk
- Settlement
- Location within Poland
- Coordinates: 53°56′40″N 18°1′34″E
- Country: Poland
- Voivodeship: Pomeranian
- County: Kościerzyna
- Gmina: Stara Kiszewa

Bąk [bɔnk] is a settlement in the administrative district of Gmina Stara Kiszewa, within Kościerzyna County, Pomeranian Voivodeship, in northern Poland.

For details of the history of the region, see History of Pomerania.
