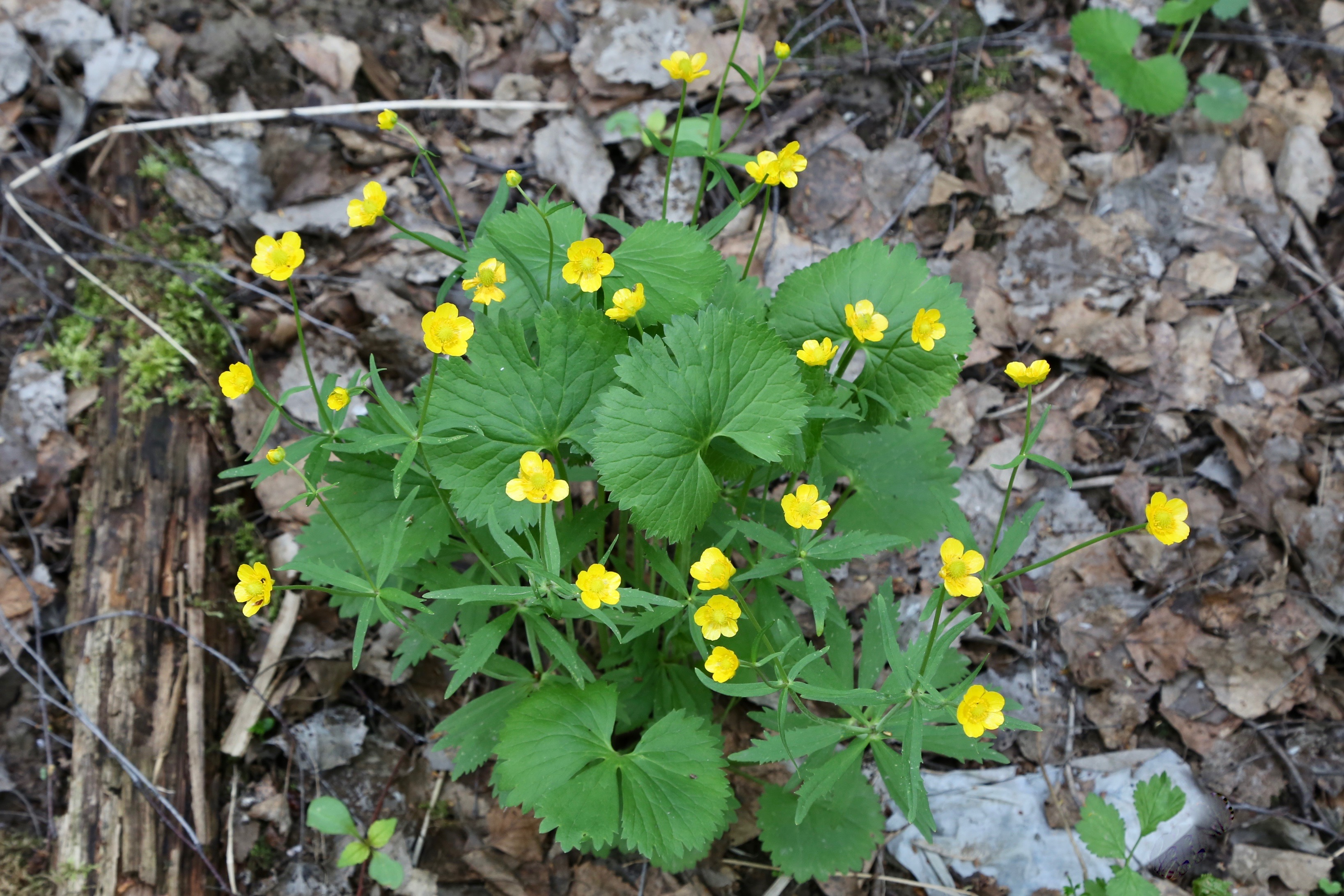

Scientific classification
- Kingdom: Plantae
- Clade: Tracheophytes
- Clade: Angiosperms
- Clade: Eudicots
- Order: Ranunculales
- Family: Ranunculaceae
- Genus: Ranunculus
- Species: R. cassubicus

Binomial name
- Ranunculus cassubicus L.

= Ranunculus cassubicus =

Species of flowering plant

Ranunculus cassubicus is a species of flowering plant belonging to the family Ranunculaceae.

Its native range is south-eastern and eastern Europe to Western Siberia and Central Asia.
