= Kokoszkowy =

Village in Pomeranian Voivodeship, Poland

- Village
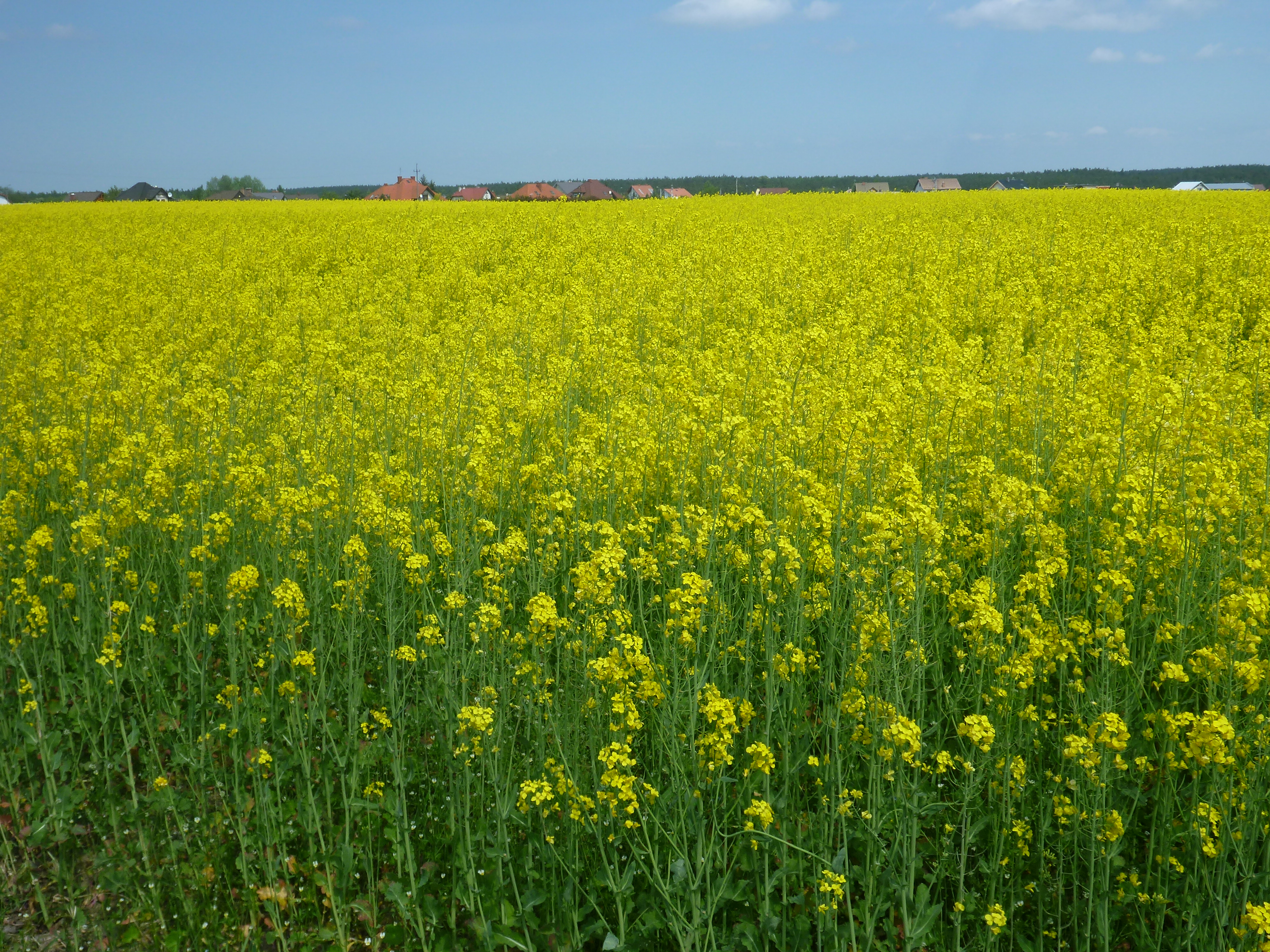
- A field of rapeseed in Kokoszkowy

- Location within Poland
- Coordinates: 53°59′50″N 18°31′41″E
- Country: Poland
- Voivodeship: Pomeranian
- County: Starogard
- Gmina: Starogard Gdański

Population
  - Total: 1,430
- Time zone: UTC+1 (CET)
  - Summer (DST): UTC+2 (CEST)
- Vehicle registration: GST

Kokoszkowy [kɔkɔʂˈkɔvɨ] is a village in the administrative district of Gmina Starogard Gdański, within Starogard County, Pomeranian Voivodeship, in northern Poland. It is located within the ethnocultural region of Kociewie in the historic region of Pomerania. It is famous for its church and it sits on the bus route between Starogard Gdański and Gdańsk.

== History ==
Kokoszkowy was a royal village of the Kingdom of Poland, administratively located in the Tczew County in the Pomeranian Voivodeship.

During the German invasion of Poland, which started World War II, on September 13, 1939, the Selbstschutz carried out a massacre of 10 Poles in the forest between Kokoszkowy and Szpęgawsk. Teachers from Kokoszkowy were among Polish teachers murdered by the Germans on October 20, 1939, in the Szpęgawski Forest as part of the Intelligenzaktion.

== Village church of St. Barbara ==
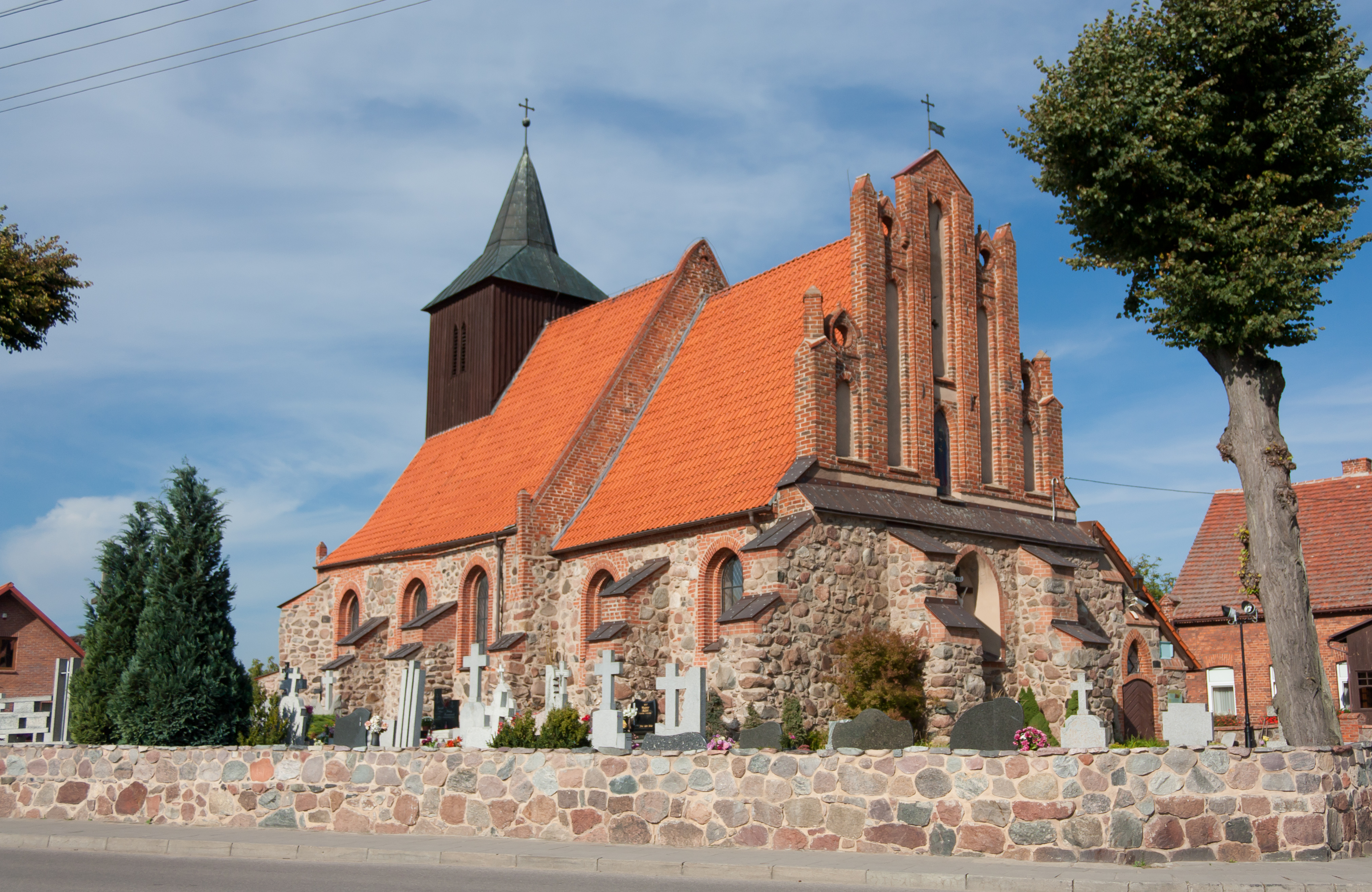
St. Barbara church

The village is home to the church of St. Barbara (Kościół Świętej Barbary). This church dates back to the 14th century. Though mainly built of boulders, ist windows and its eastern gable make it an example of Brick Gothic style. There is a graveyard and a house behind the church aptly named after Pope John Paul II.

This church of the 14th century Knights Hospitaller was restored between 1995 and 2013 by the local parish priest Fr. Mark Błażejczyk, with the participation of numerous people of good will.

In spring time, the fields around the village are a bright yellow as the region is known for growing the rapeseed oil plants.
