= Lipinki Szlacheckie =

Village in Pomeranian Voivodeship, Poland

- Village
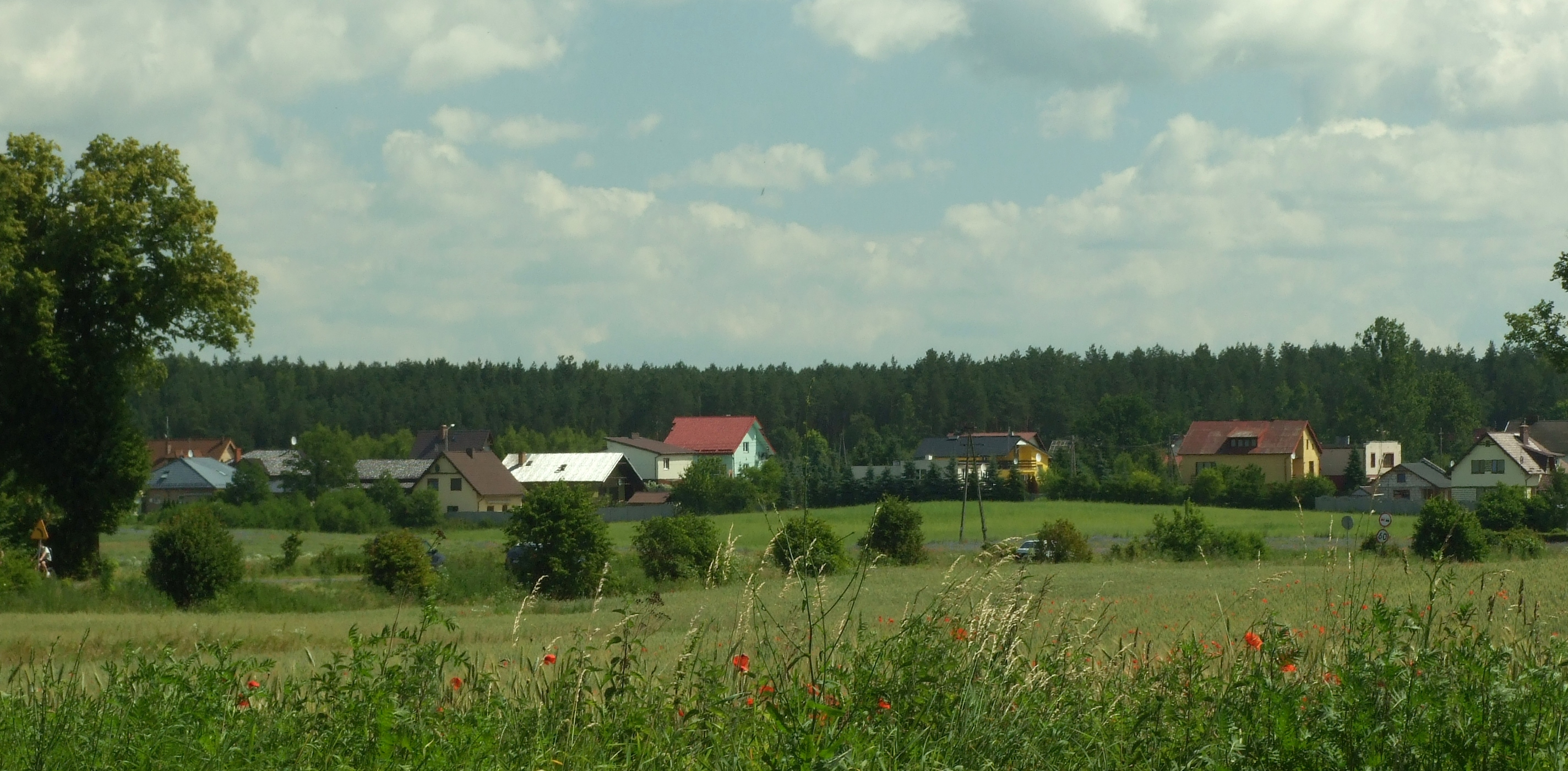
- View of the village as seen from nearby Jabłowo

- Location within Poland
- Coordinates: 53°55′38″N 18°36′24″E
- Country: Poland
- Voivodeship: Pomeranian
- County: Starogard
- Gmina: Starogard Gdański
- Population: 274
- Time zone: UTC+1 (CET)
  - Summer (DST): UTC+2 (CEST)
- Vehicle registration: GST

Lipinki Szlacheckie (Polish pronunciation: [liˈpiŋkʲi ʂlaˈxɛtskʲɛ]) is a village in the administrative district of Gmina Starogard Gdański, within Starogard County, Pomeranian Voivodeship, in northern Poland. It is located within the ethnocultural region of Kociewie in the historic region of Pomerania.
