= Linowiec, Pomeranian Voivodeship =

Village in Pomeranian Voivodeship, Poland

Linowiec
- Village
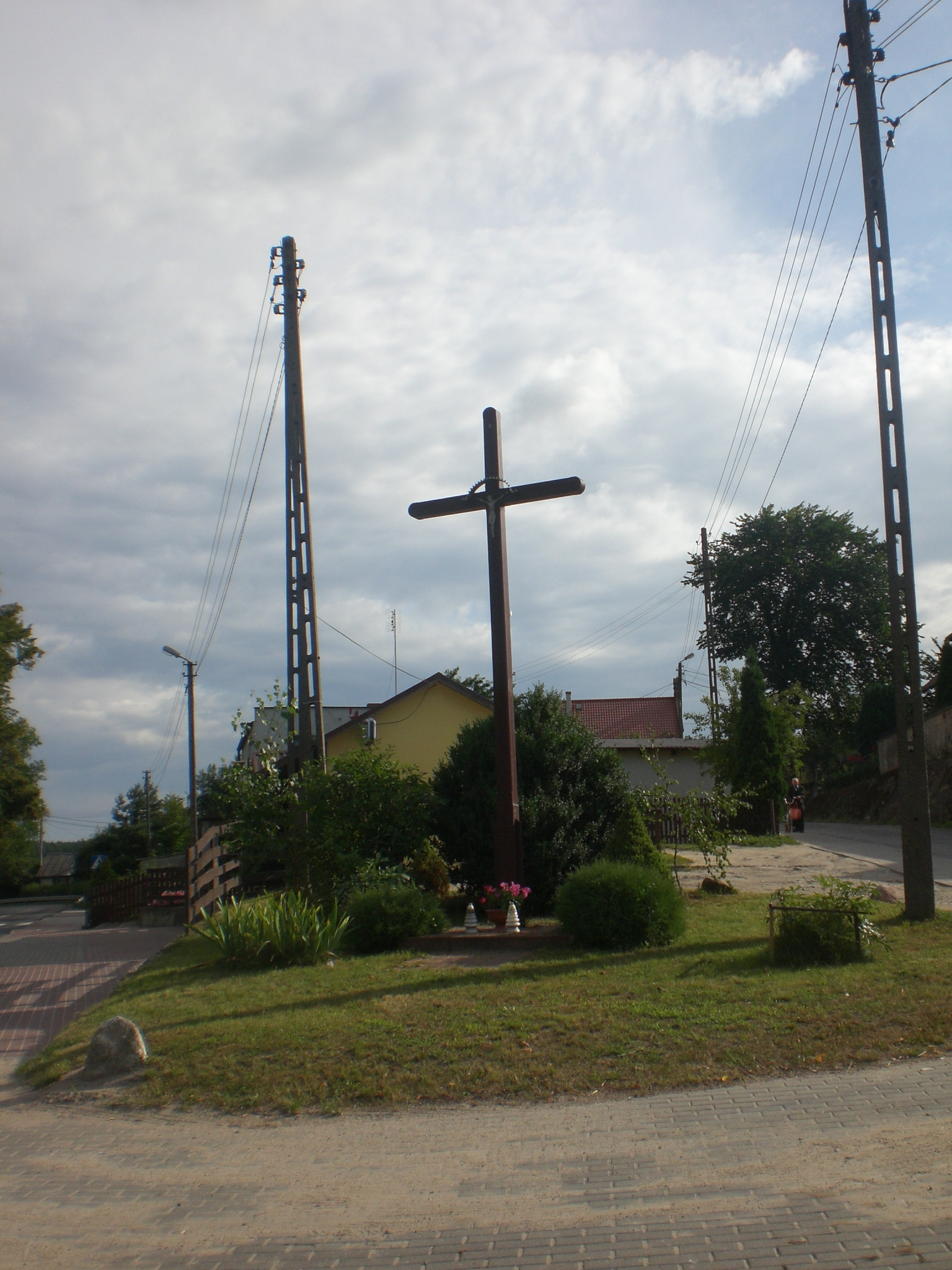
- Wayside cross in Linowiec

- Location within Poland
- Coordinates: 54°1′2″N 18°29′49″E
- Country: Poland
- Voivodeship: Pomeranian
- County: Starogard
- Gmina: Starogard Gdański
- Population: 363
- Time zone: UTC+1 (CET)
  - Summer (DST): UTC+2 (CEST)
- Vehicle registration: GST

Linowiec [liˈnɔvjɛt͡s] is a village in the administrative district of Gmina Starogard Gdański, within Starogard County, Pomeranian Voivodeship, in northern Poland. It is located within the ethnocultural region of Kociewie in the historic region of Pomerania.

== History ==
Linowiec was a royal village of the Polish Crown, administratively located in the Tczew County in the Pomeranian Voivodeship.

During the German occupation of Poland (World War II), the Germans murdered local Polish teachers in the Szpęgawski Forest (see Intelligenzaktion).
