= Najmusy =

Village in Pomeranian Voivodeship, Poland

- Settlement
- Location within Poland
- Coordinates: 53°58′53″N 18°38′37″E
- Country: Poland
- Voivodeship: Pomeranian
- County: Starogard
- Gmina: Starogard Gdański
- Time zone: UTC+1 (CET)
  - Summer (DST): UTC+2 (CEST)
- Vehicle registration: GST

Najmusy [nai̯ˈmusɨ] is a settlement in the administrative district of Gmina Starogard Gdański, in Starogard County, Pomeranian Voivodeship, in northern Poland. It is in the ethnocultural region of Kociewie in the historic region of Pomerania.
