= Kolincz =

Village in Pomeranian Voivodeship, Poland

- Village
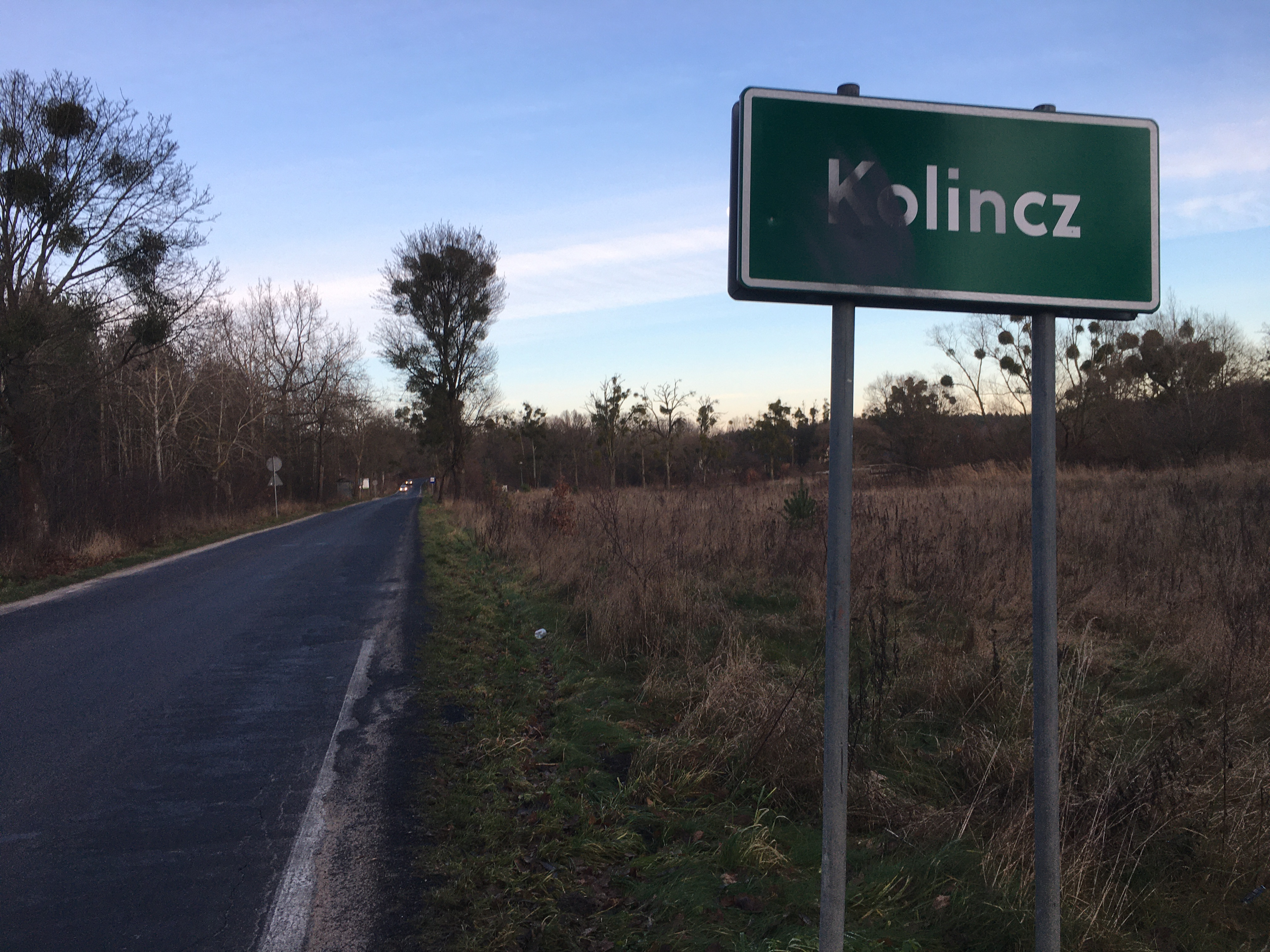

- Location within Poland
- Coordinates: 53°58′1″N 18°38′41″E
- Country: Poland
- Voivodeship: Pomeranian
- County: Starogard
- Gmina: Starogard Gdański
- Population: 375
- Time zone: UTC+1 (CET)
  - Summer (DST): UTC+2 (CEST)
- Postal code: 83-211
- Vehicle registration: GST

Kolincz [ˈkɔlint͡ʂ] is a village in the administrative district of Gmina Starogard Gdański, in Starogard County, Pomeranian Voivodeship, in northern Poland. It is located within the ethnocultural region of Kociewie in the historic region of Pomerania.

There is a Jewish cemetery in Kolincz.
