= Klonówka, Pomeranian Voivodeship =

Village in Pomeranian Voivodeship, Poland

Klonówka
- Village
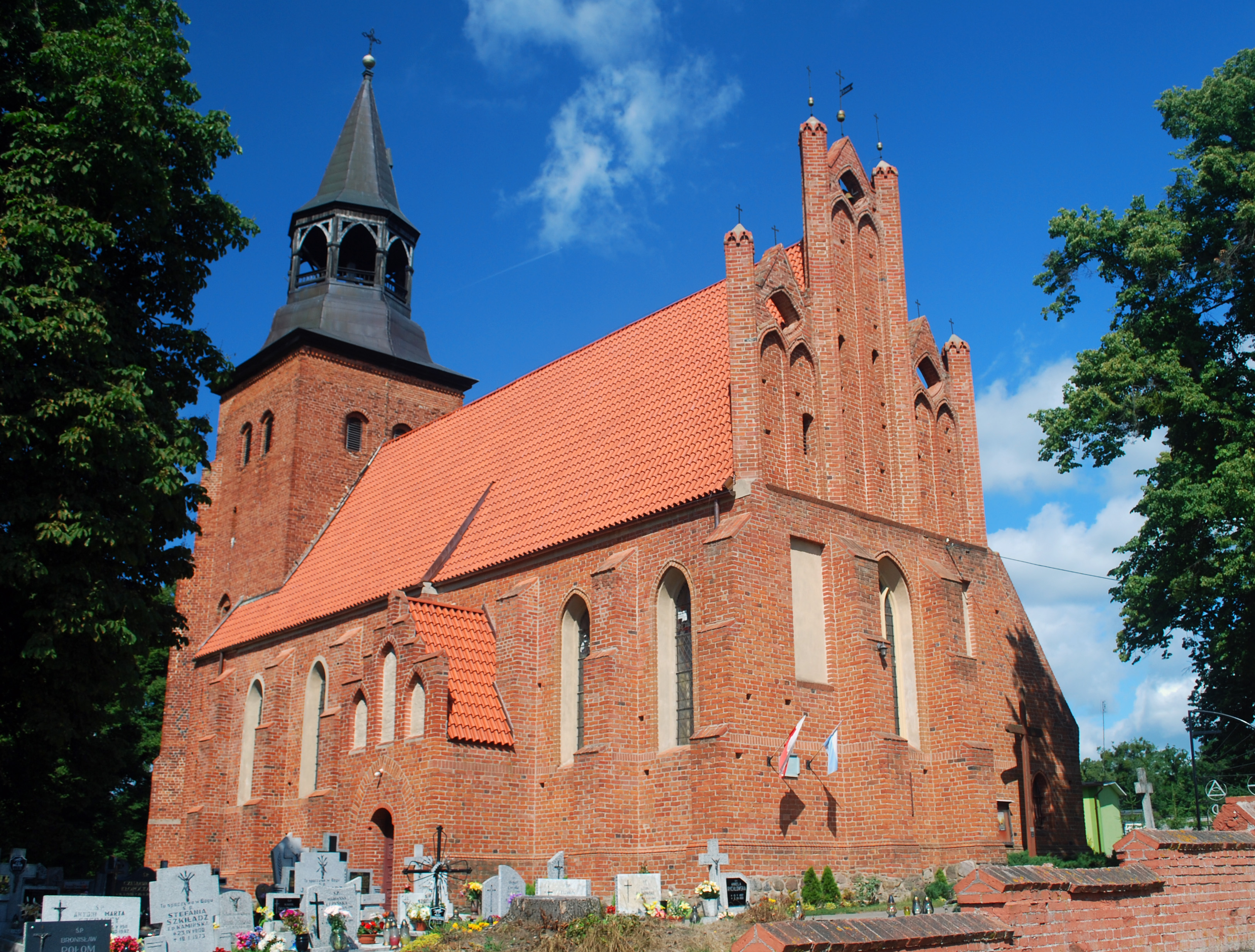
- Gothic Saint Catherine church in Klonówka

- Location within Poland
- Coordinates: 53°58′1″N 18°38′41″E
- Country: Poland
- Voivodeship: Pomeranian
- County: Starogard
- Gmina: Starogard Gdański
- Population: 430
- Time zone: UTC+1 (CET)
  - Summer (DST): UTC+2 (CEST)
- Vehicle registration: GST

Klonówka [klɔˈnufka] is a village in the administrative district of Gmina Starogard Gdański, within Starogard County, Pomeranian Voivodeship, in northern Poland. It is located within the ethnocultural region of Kociewie in the historic region of Pomerania.

== History ==
Klonówka was a royal village of the Polish Crown, administratively located in the Tczew County in the Pomeranian Voivodeship.

During the German occupation of Poland (World War II), the Germans expelled several Polish families, whose farms were then handed over to German colonists as part of the Lebensraum policy.
