= Żabno, Starogard County =

Village in Pomeranian Voivodeship, Poland

Żabno
- Village
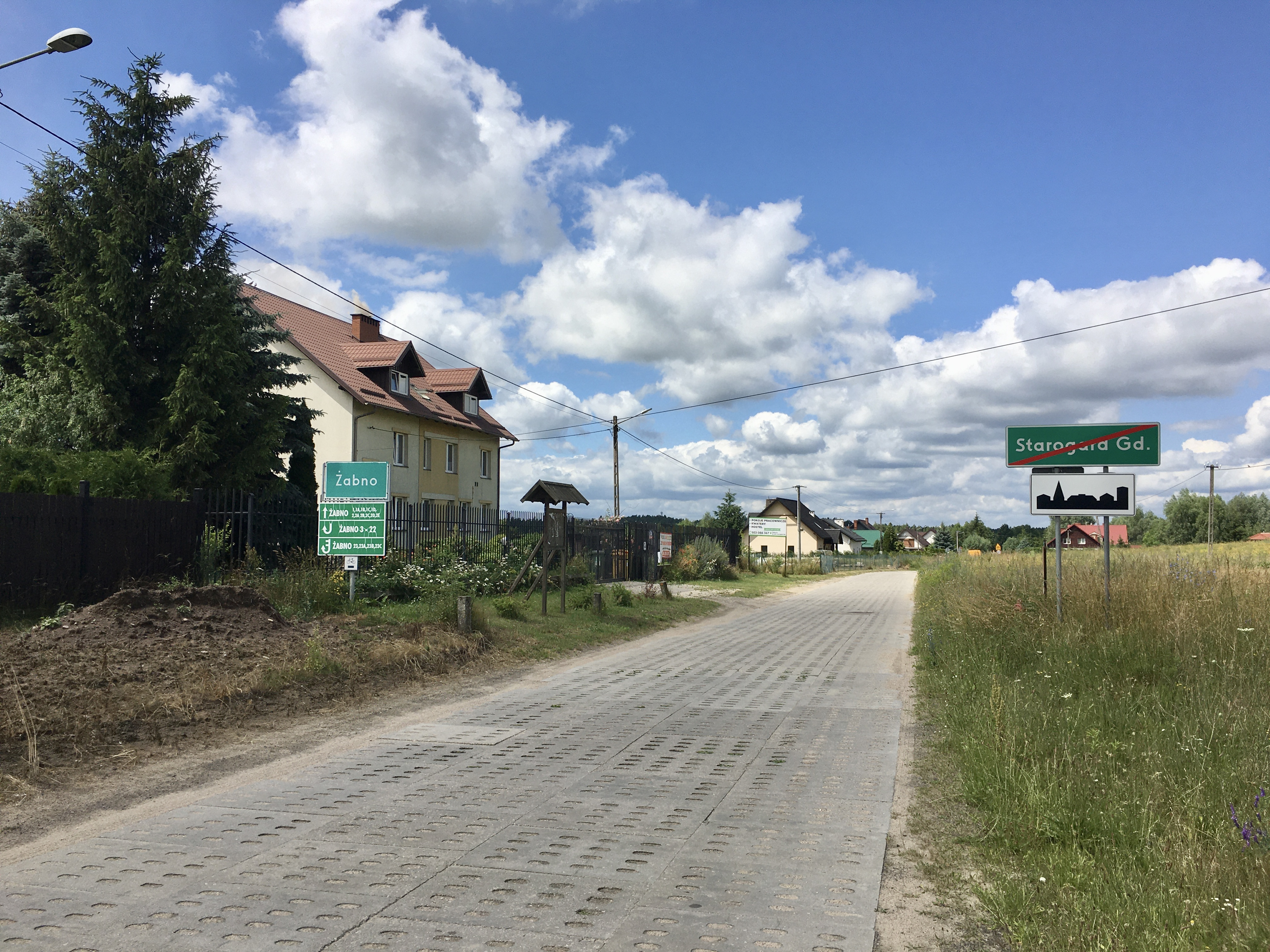

- Location within Poland
- Coordinates: 53°58′58″N 18°29′11″E
- Country: Poland
- Voivodeship: Pomeranian
- County: Starogard
- Gmina: Starogard Gdański
- Population: 486
- Time zone: UTC+1 (CET)
  - Summer (DST): UTC+2 (CEST)
- Vehicle registration: GST

Żabno [ˈʐabnɔ] is a village in the administrative district of Gmina Starogard Gdański, within Starogard County, Pomeranian Voivodeship, in northern Poland. It is located within the ethnocultural region of Kociewie in the historic region of Pomerania.

Żabno was a royal village of the Kingdom of Poland, administratively located in the Tczew County in the Pomeranian Voivodeship.
