= Sumin, Pomeranian Voivodeship =

Village in Pomeranian Voivodeship, Poland

Sumin
- Village
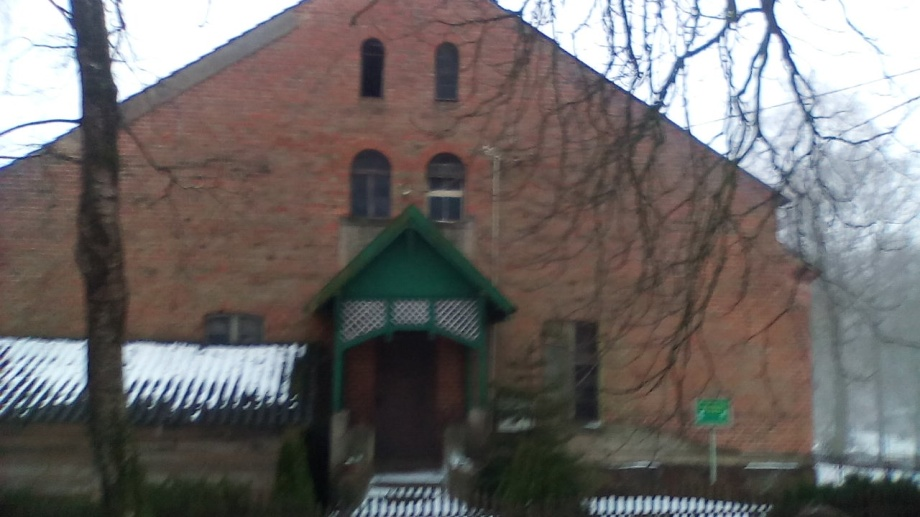
- The former distillery in the village

- Location within Poland
- Coordinates: 53°55′9″N 18°26′58″E
- Country: Poland
- Voivodeship: Pomeranian
- County: Starogard
- Gmina: Starogard Gdański
- Population: 580
- Time zone: UTC+1 (CET)
  - Summer (DST): UTC+2 (CEST)
- Vehicle registration: GST

Sumin [ˈsumin] is a village in the administrative district of Gmina Starogard Gdański, within Starogard County, Pomeranian Voivodeship, in northern Poland. It is located in the ethnocultural region of Kociewie in the historic region of Pomerania.

== Description ==
Sumin is situated on the edge of the lake of Sumiński, covering an area of 98.91 ha. The village is a very old settlement, as testified by an historical tomb uncovered in 1960. Today the town has 660 residents and in this respect is the sixth largest in the Starogard Gdański commune. The majority of the village’s residents are employed in agriculture. Somino is the oldest known name of village, dating from c. 1270.

=== Geography ===
Glacial troughs filled with water of the lake are a characteristic element of the local terrain. The highest hill in the Starogard Gdański commune is 127.6 ASL, which is located in the Sumin area. The urban planning largely dates from the c. 1908, when a Prussian colonization committee made the division and settlement of a landed estate. After regaining independence following World War I, Józef Haller granted areas of agricultural farmland in Sumin to his soldiers, of whose descendants, among others, manage them to this day.
