= Płaczewo, Starogard County =

Village in Pomeranian Voivodeship, Poland

Płaczewo
- Settlement
- Location within Poland
- Coordinates: 53°54′5″N 18°29′25″E
- Country: Poland
- Voivodeship: Pomeranian
- County: Starogard
- Gmina: Starogard Gdański
- Time zone: UTC+1 (CET)
  - Summer (DST): UTC+2 (CEST)
- Vehicle registration: GST

Płaczewo [pwaˈt͡ʂɛvɔ] is a settlement in the administrative district of Gmina Starogard Gdański, within Starogard County, Pomeranian Voivodeship, in northern Poland. It is located in the ethnocultural region of Kociewie in the historic region of Pomerania.
