= Rywałd, Pomeranian Voivodeship =

Village in Pomeranian Voivodeship, Poland

Rywałd
- Village
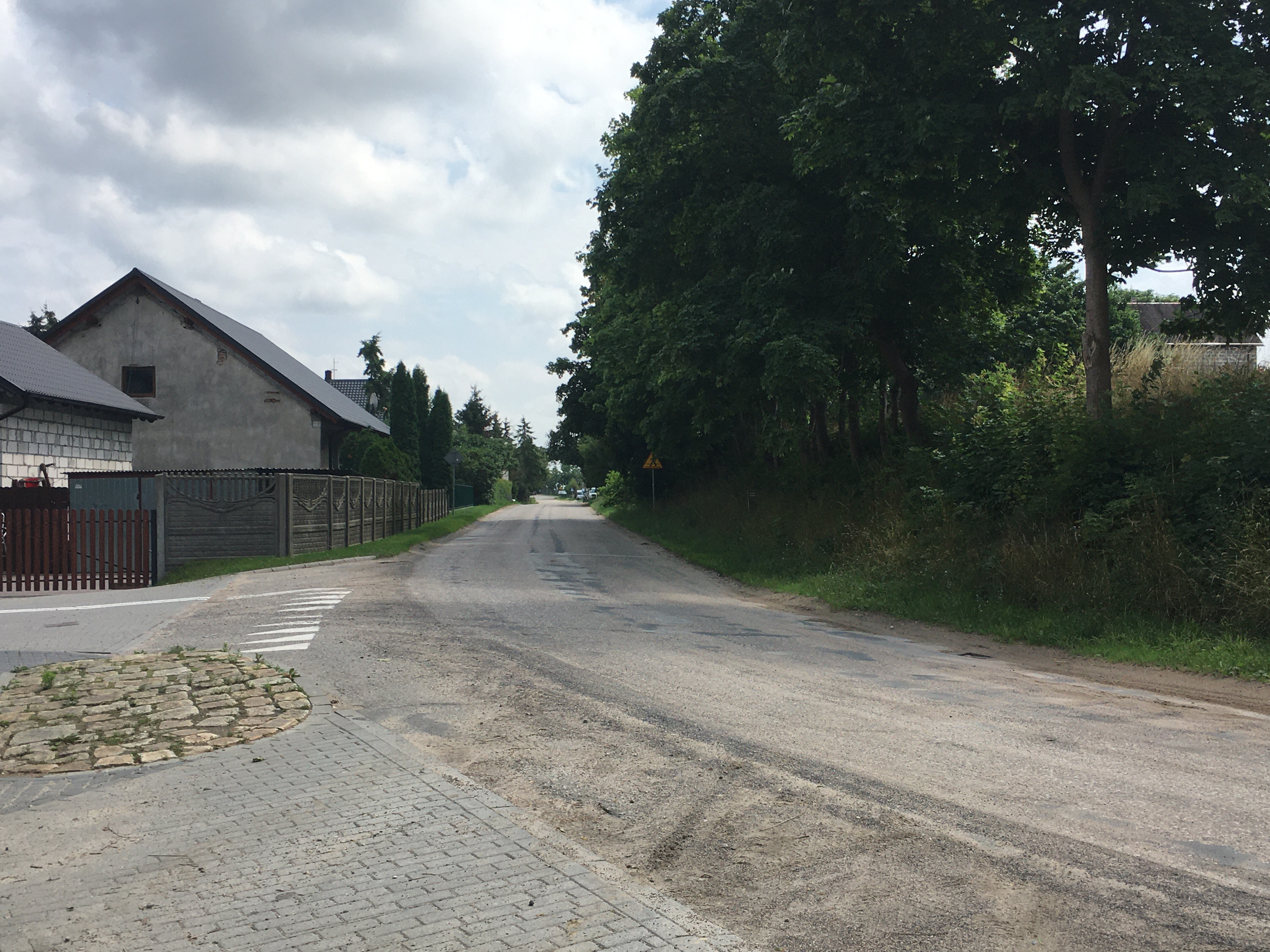

- Location within Poland
- Coordinates: 53°59′0″N 18°36′38″E
- Country: Poland
- Voivodeship: Pomeranian
- County: Starogard
- Gmina: Starogard Gdański
- Population: 603
- Time zone: UTC+1 (CET)
  - Summer (DST): UTC+2 (CEST)
- Vehicle registration: GST

Rywałd [ˈrɨvau̯t] is a village in the administrative district of Gmina Starogard Gdański, within Starogard County, Pomeranian Voivodeship, in northern Poland. It is located within the ethnocultural region of Kociewie in the historic region of Pomerania.

Rywałd was a royal village of the Polish Crown, administratively located in the Tczew County in the Pomeranian Voivodeship.
