= Ciecholewy, Starogard County =

Village in Pomeranian Voivodeship, Poland

Ciecholewy
- Village
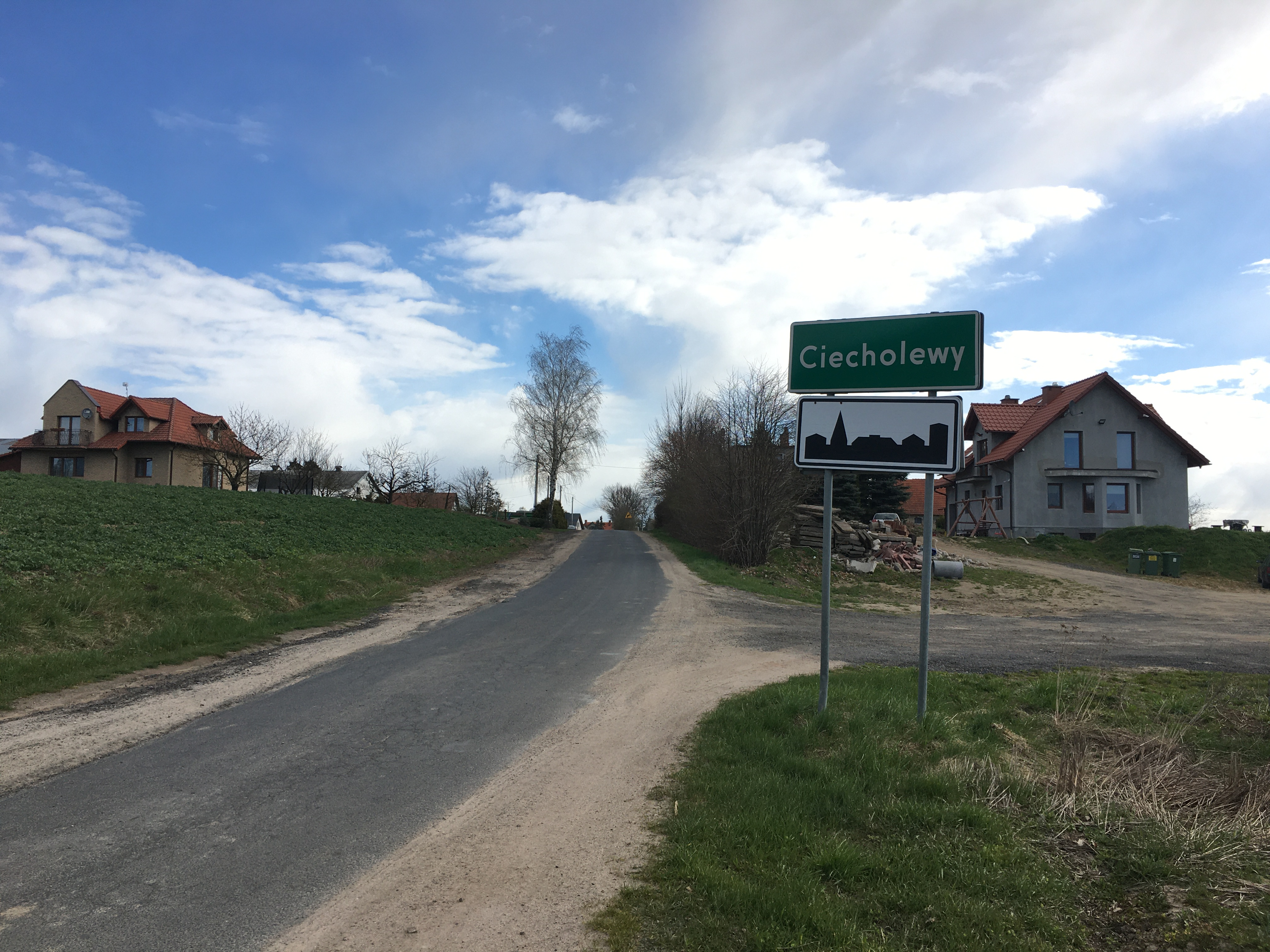

- Location within Poland
- Coordinates: 54°1′41″N 18°34′30″E
- Country: Poland
- Voivodeship: Pomeranian
- County: Starogard
- Gmina: Starogard Gdański

Population
  - Total: 221
- Time zone: UTC+1 (CET)
  - Summer (DST): UTC+2 (CEST)
- Vehicle registration: GST

Ciecholewy [t͡ɕɛxɔˈlɛvɨ] is a village in the administrative district of Gmina Starogard Gdański, within Starogard County, Pomeranian Voivodeship, in northern Poland. It is located within the ethnocultural region of Kociewie in the historic region of Pomerania.
