= Sucumin =

Village in Pomeranian Voivodeship, Poland

- Village
- Location within Poland
- Coordinates: 53°56′13″N 18°26′5″E
- Country: Poland
- Voivodeship: Pomeranian
- County: Starogard
- Gmina: Starogard Gdański

Population
  - Total: 570
- Time zone: UTC+1 (CET)
  - Summer (DST): UTC+2 (CEST)
- Vehicle registration: GST

Sucumin [suˈt͡sumin] is a village in the administrative district of Gmina Starogard Gdański, within Starogard County, Pomeranian Voivodeship, in northern Poland. It is located in the ethnocultural region of Kociewie in the historic region of Pomerania.
