= Zduny, Pomeranian Voivodeship =

Village in Pomeranian Voivodeship, Poland

Zduny
- Village
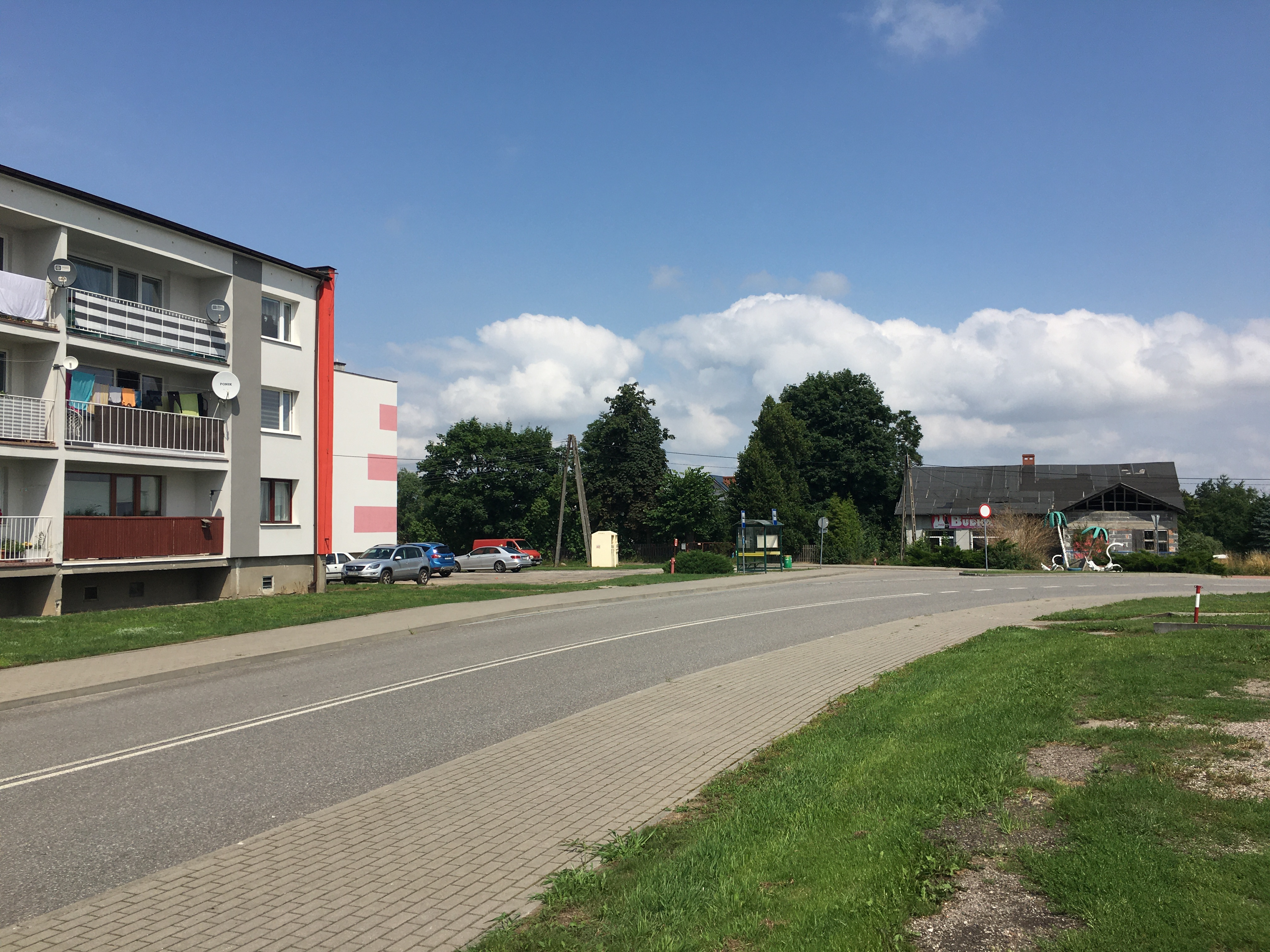

- Location within Poland
- Coordinates: 54°0′39″N 18°37′45″E
- Country: Poland
- Voivodeship: Pomeranian
- County: Starogard
- Gmina: Starogard Gdański
- Elevation: 65 m (213 ft)

Population
  - Total: 616
- Time zone: UTC+1 (CET)
  - Summer (DST): UTC+2 (CEST)
- Vehicle registration: GST

Zduny [ˈzdunɨ] is a village in the administrative district of Gmina Starogard Gdański, within Starogard County, Pomeranian Voivodeship, in northern Poland. It is located in the ethnocultural region of Kociewie in the historic region of Pomerania.
