= Koteże =

Village in Pomeranian Voivodeship, Poland

- Village
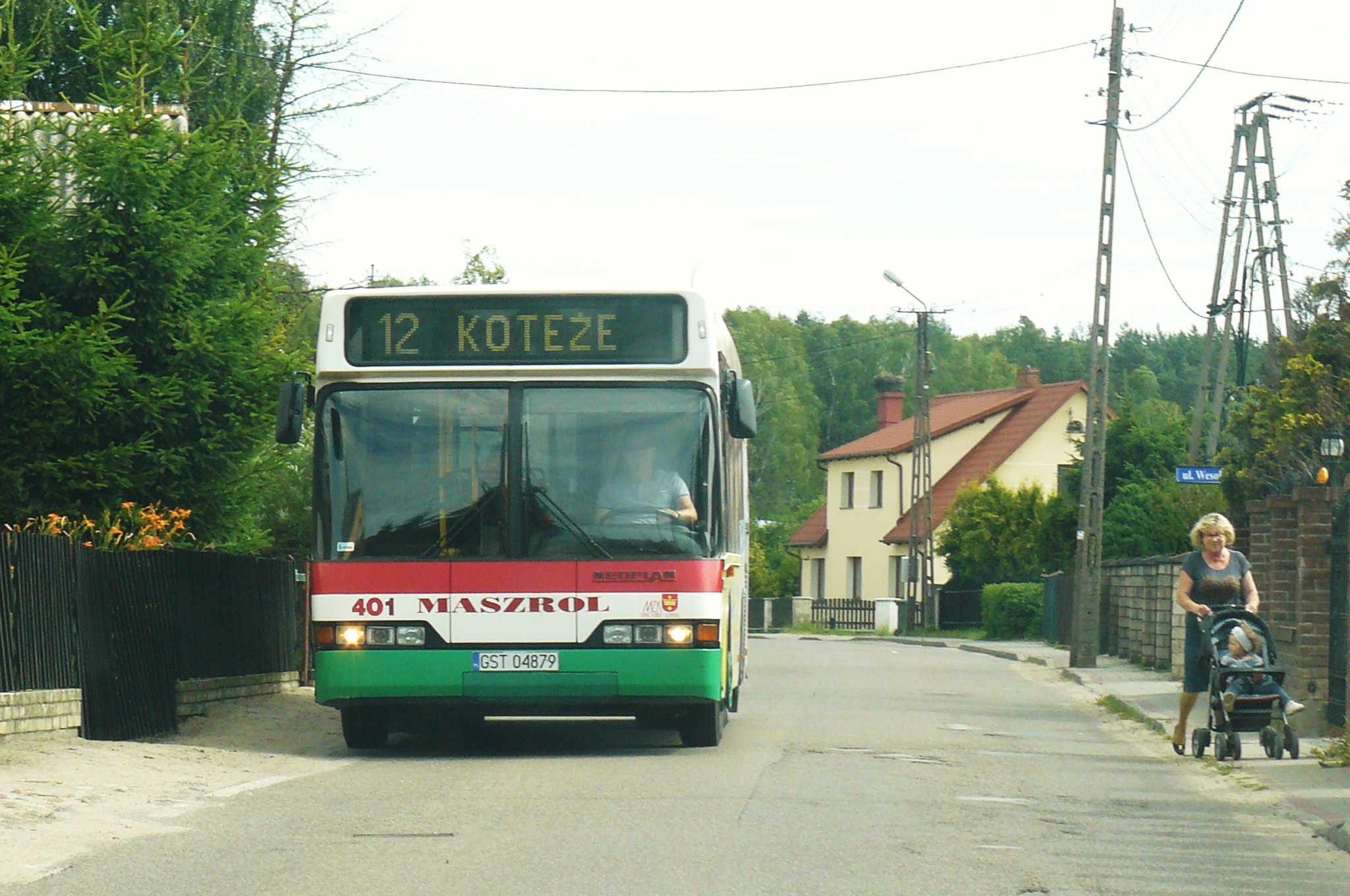
- A local bus displaying Koteże on its destination blind, 2015

- Location within Poland
- Coordinates: 53°55′27″N 18°29′24″E
- Country: Poland
- Voivodeship: Pomeranian
- County: Starogard
- Gmina: Starogard Gdański
- Population: 443
- Time zone: UTC+1 (CET)
  - Summer (DST): UTC+2 (CEST)
- Vehicle registration: GST

Koteże [kɔˈtɛʐɛ] is a village in the administrative district of Gmina Starogard Gdański, within Starogard County, Pomeranian Voivodeship, in northern Poland. It is located within the ethnocultural region of Kociewie in the historic region of Pomerania.
