= Nowa Wieś Rzeczna =

Village in Pomeranian Voivodeship, Poland

- Village
- Location within Poland
- Coordinates: 53°57′49″N 18°29′0″E
- Country: Poland
- Voivodeship: Pomeranian
- County: Starogard
- Gmina: Starogard Gdański
- Population: 685
- Time zone: UTC+1 (CET)
  - Summer (DST): UTC+2 (CEST)
- Vehicle registration: GST

Nowa Wieś Rzeczna [ˈnɔva ˈvjɛɕ ˈʐɛt͡ʂna] is a village in the administrative district of Gmina Starogard Gdański, within Starogard County, Pomeranian Voivodeship, in northern Poland. It is located within the ethnocultural region of Kociewie in the historic region of Pomerania.
