= Krąg, Pomeranian Voivodeship =

Village in Pomeranian Voivodeship, Poland

Krąg
- Village
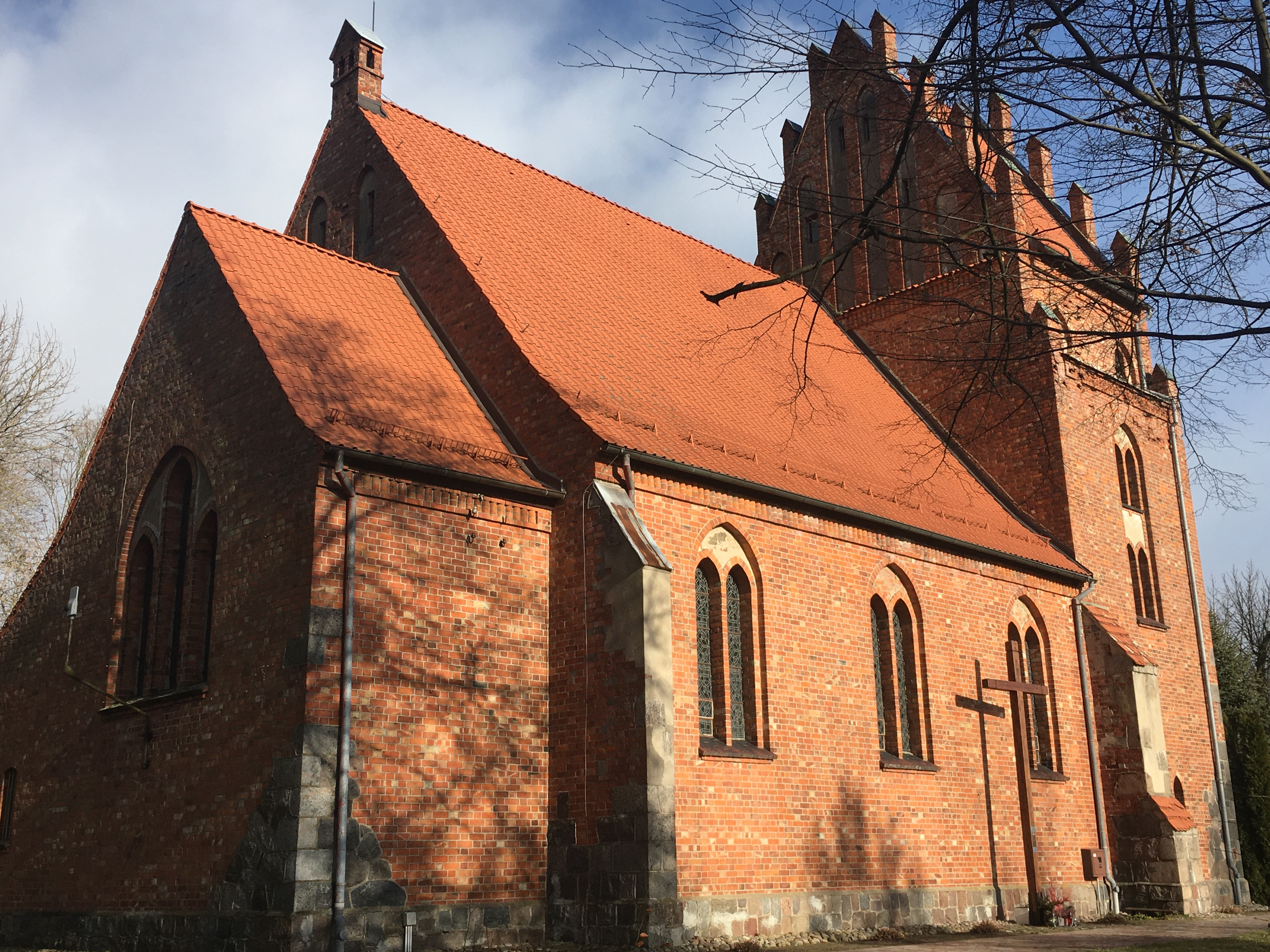
- Church of the Assumption of Mary in Krąg

- Location within Poland
- Coordinates: 54°0′12″N 18°26′31″E
- Country: Poland
- Voivodeship: Pomeranian
- County: Starogard
- Gmina: Starogard Gdański
- Population: 480
- Time zone: UTC+1 (CET)
  - Summer (DST): UTC+2 (CEST)
- Vehicle registration: GST

Krąg [krɔnk] is a village in the administrative district of Gmina Starogard Gdański, within Starogard County, Pomeranian Voivodeship, in northern Poland. It is located in the ethnocultural region of Kociewie in the historic region of Pomerania.

== History ==
Krąg was a private village owned by various Polish nobles, incl. the Machwic and Odrowski families, administratively located in the Tczew County in the Pomeranian Voivodeship of the Kingdom of Poland. It was annexed by Prussia in the First Partition of Poland in 1772. Following World War I, Poland regained independence and control of the village.

During the German occupation of Poland (World War II), Krąg was one of the sites of executions of Poles, carried out by the Germans in 1939 as part of the Intelligenzaktion.
