= Brunswałd =

Settlement in Kociewie

- Colony
- Location within Poland
- Coordinates: 53°57′49″N 18°34′28″E
- Country: Poland
- Voivodeship: Pomeranian
- County: Starogard
- Gmina: Starogard Gdański
- SIMC: 0173380

Brunswałd (German: Braunswalde) is a colony in the administrative district of Gmina Starogard Gdański, within Starogard County, Pomeranian Voivodeship, in northern Poland. The settlement lies within the ethnocultural region of Kociewie.

An entry on Brunswałd in the Geographical Dictionary of the Kingdom of Poland records that the village's church was destroyed during the Deluge in 1626. The archæological remains of an Iron Age settlement are also noted within the vicinity of the village.
