= Stary Las, Pomeranian Voivodeship =

Village in Pomeranian Voivodeship, Poland

Stary Las
- Village
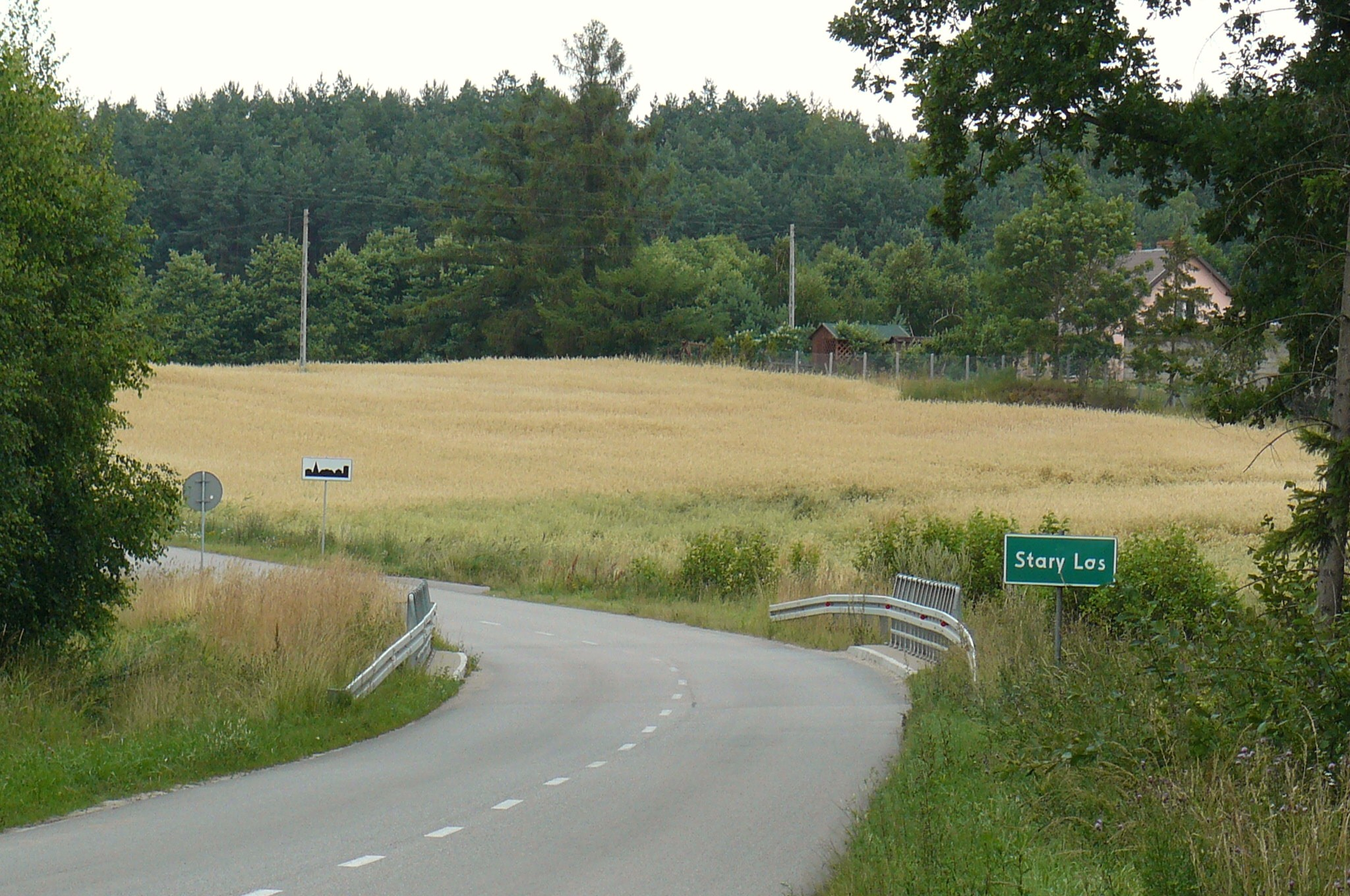

- Location within Poland
- Coordinates: 53°57′24″N 18°26′28″E
- Country: Poland
- Voivodeship: Pomeranian
- County: Starogard
- Gmina: Starogard Gdański
- Time zone: UTC+1 (CET)
  - Summer (DST): UTC+2 (CEST)
- Vehicle registration: GST

Stary Las [ˈstarɨ ˈlas] is a village in the administrative district of Gmina Starogard Gdański, within Starogard County, Pomeranian Voivodeship, in northern Poland. It is located in the ethnocultural region of Kociewie in the historic region of Pomerania.
