= Helenowo, Pomeranian Voivodeship =

Settlement in Pomeranian Voivodeship, Poland

Helenowo
- Colony
- Location within Poland
- Coordinates: 54°0′4″N 18°38′17″E
- Country: Poland
- Voivodeship: Pomeranian
- County: Starogard
- Gmina: Starogard Gdański
- Time zone: UTC+1 (CET)
  - Summer (DST): UTC+2 (CEST)
- Vehicle registration: GST

Helenowo [xɛlɛˈnɔvɔ] is a colony in the administrative district of Gmina Starogard Gdański, within Starogard County, Pomeranian Voivodeship, in northern Poland. It is located within the ethnocultural region of Kociewie in the historic region of Pomerania.
