= Janin, Pomeranian Voivodeship =

Village in Pomeranian Voivodeship, Poland

Janin
- Village
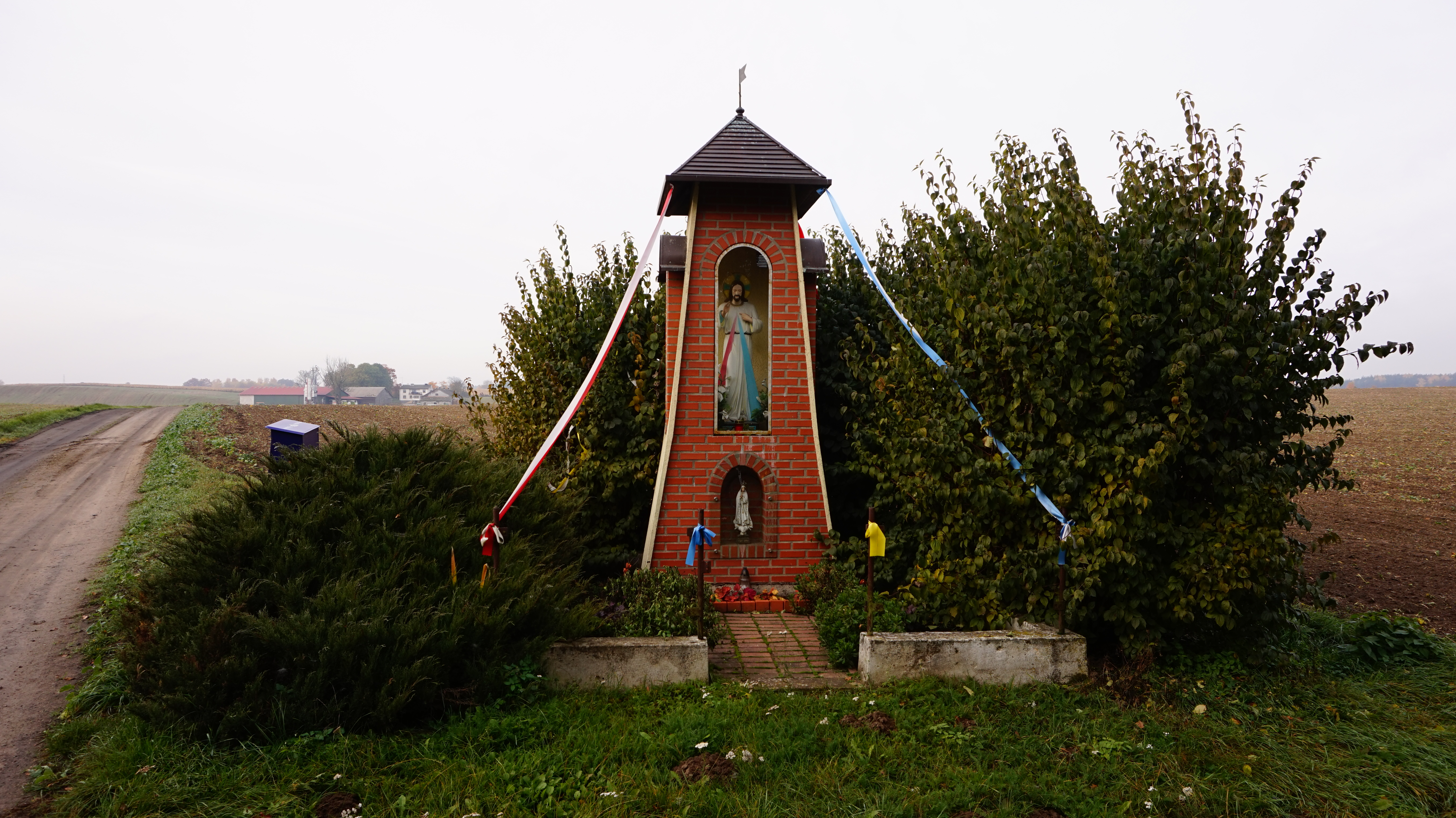
- A wayside shrine in the village

- Location within Poland
- Coordinates: 54°1′55″N 18°31′16″E
- Country: Poland
- Voivodeship: Pomeranian
- County: Starogard
- Gmina: Starogard Gdański
- Population: 130
- Time zone: UTC+1 (CET)
  - Summer (DST): UTC+2 (CEST)
- Vehicle registration: GST

Janin [ˈjanin] is a village in the administrative district of Gmina Starogard Gdański, within Starogard County, Pomeranian Voivodeship, in northern Poland. It is located within the ethnocultural region of Kociewie in the historic region of Pomerania.
