= Rokocin =

Village in Pomeranian Voivodeship, Poland

- Village
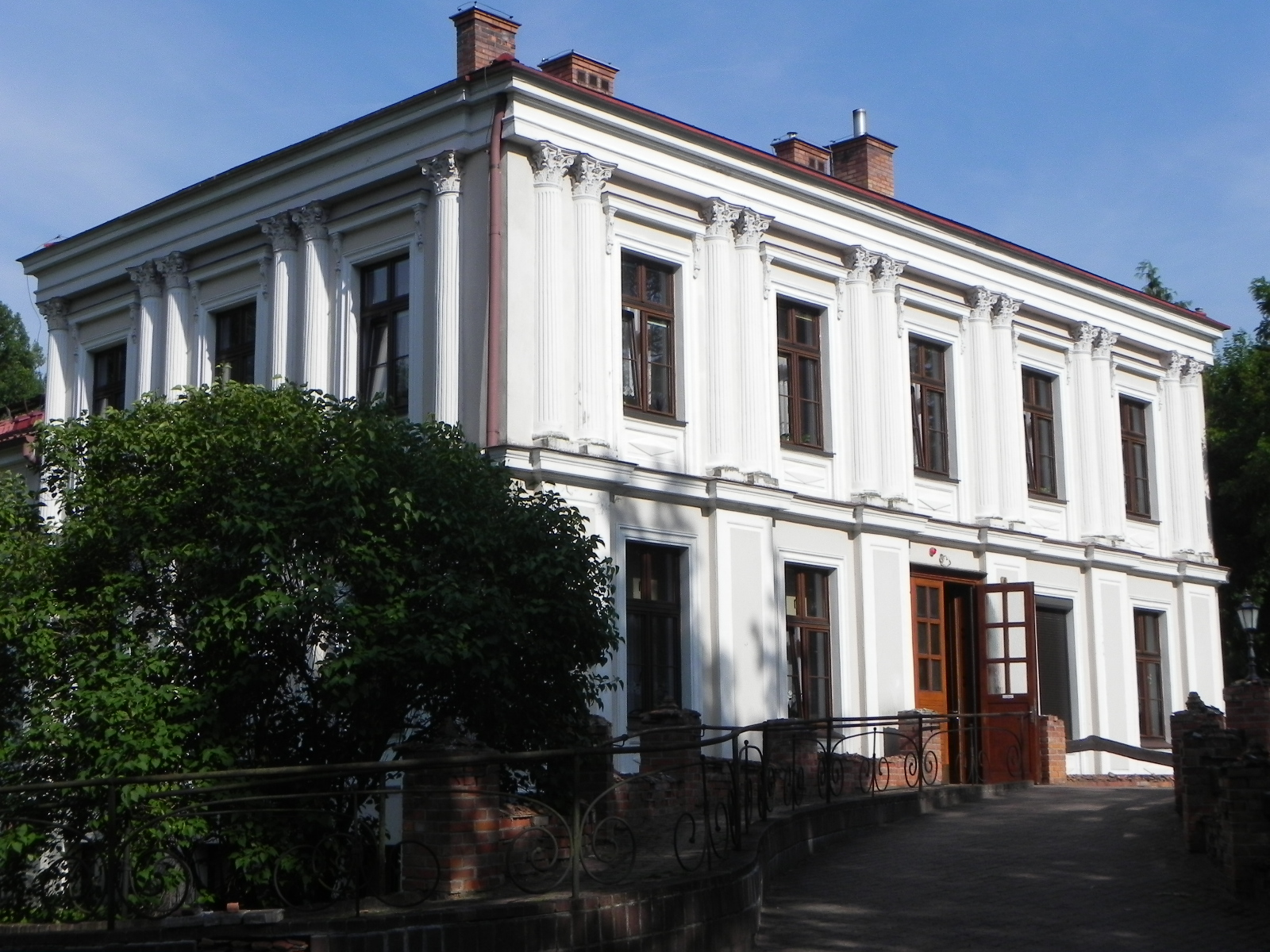
- Nursing home in Rokocin

- Location within Poland
- Coordinates: 53°56′45″N 18°28′0″E
- Country: Poland
- Voivodeship: Pomeranian
- County: Starogard
- Gmina: Starogard Gdański
- Population: 512
- Time zone: UTC+1 (CET)
  - Summer (DST): UTC+2 (CEST)
- Vehicle registration: GST

Rokocin [rɔˈkɔt͡ɕin] is a village in the administrative district of Gmina Starogard Gdański, within Starogard County, Pomeranian Voivodeship, in northern Poland. It is located within the ethnocultural region of Kociewie in the historic region of Pomerania.

== History ==
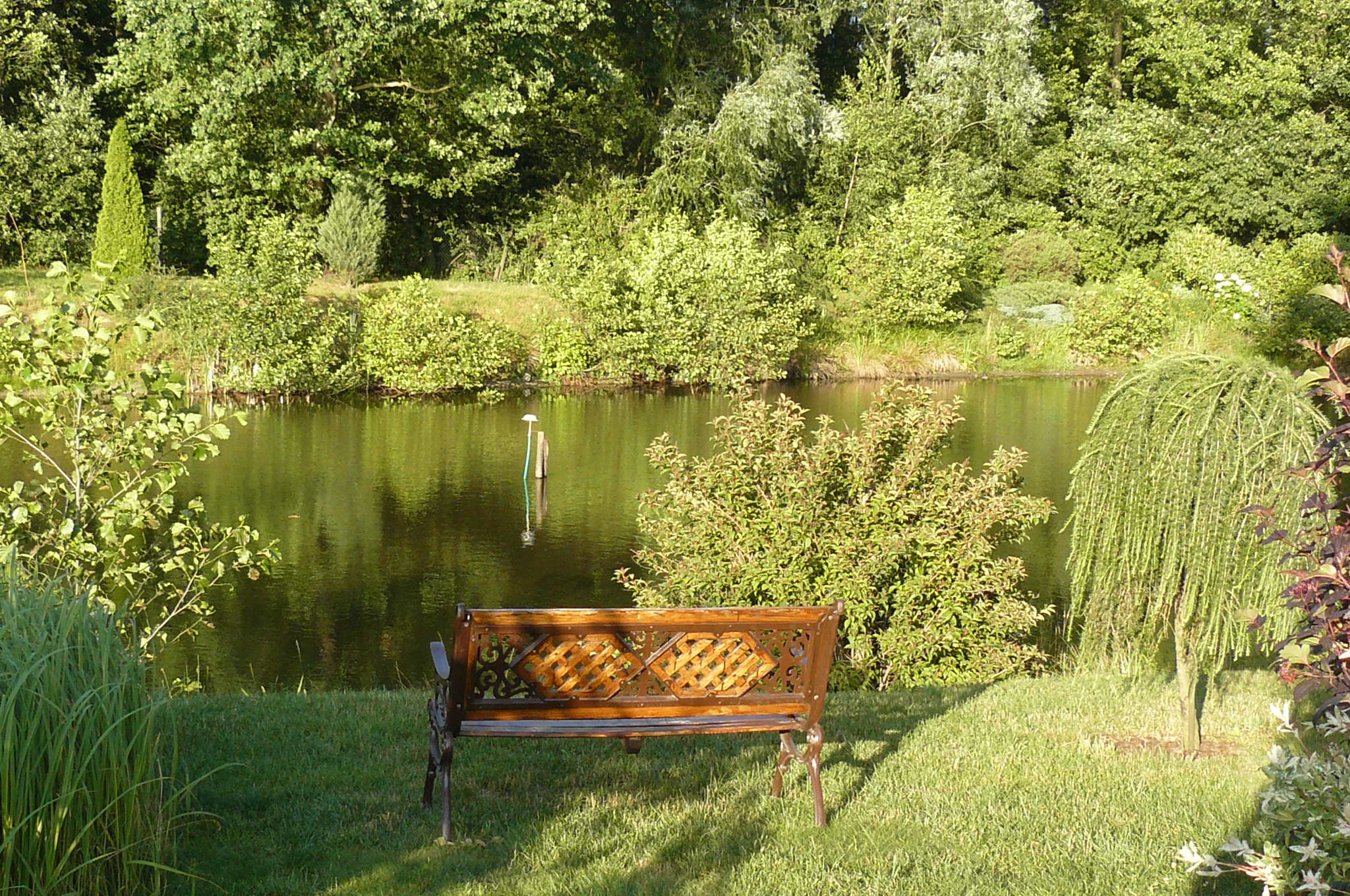
Historic park in Rokocin

The village was mentioned under the Latinized name Ricosino in documents from the 12th century when it was part of fragmented medieval Poland. In the past it also appeared under the Old Polish names Rokoczyn, Rykosyn, Rokosin. Coins of 9th-century ruler Æthelberht, King of Wessex were found in the village in the 19th century. Rokocin was a royal village of the Polish Crown, administratively located in the Tczew County in the Pomeranian Voivodeship.

In 1934, Rokocin was visited by President of Poland Ignacy Mościcki.

During the German occupation of Poland (World War II), Rokocin was one of the sites of executions of Poles, carried out by the Germans in 1939 as part of the Intelligenzaktion.
