= Dąbrówka, Starogard County =

Village in Pomeranian Voivodeship, Poland

Dąbrówka
- Village
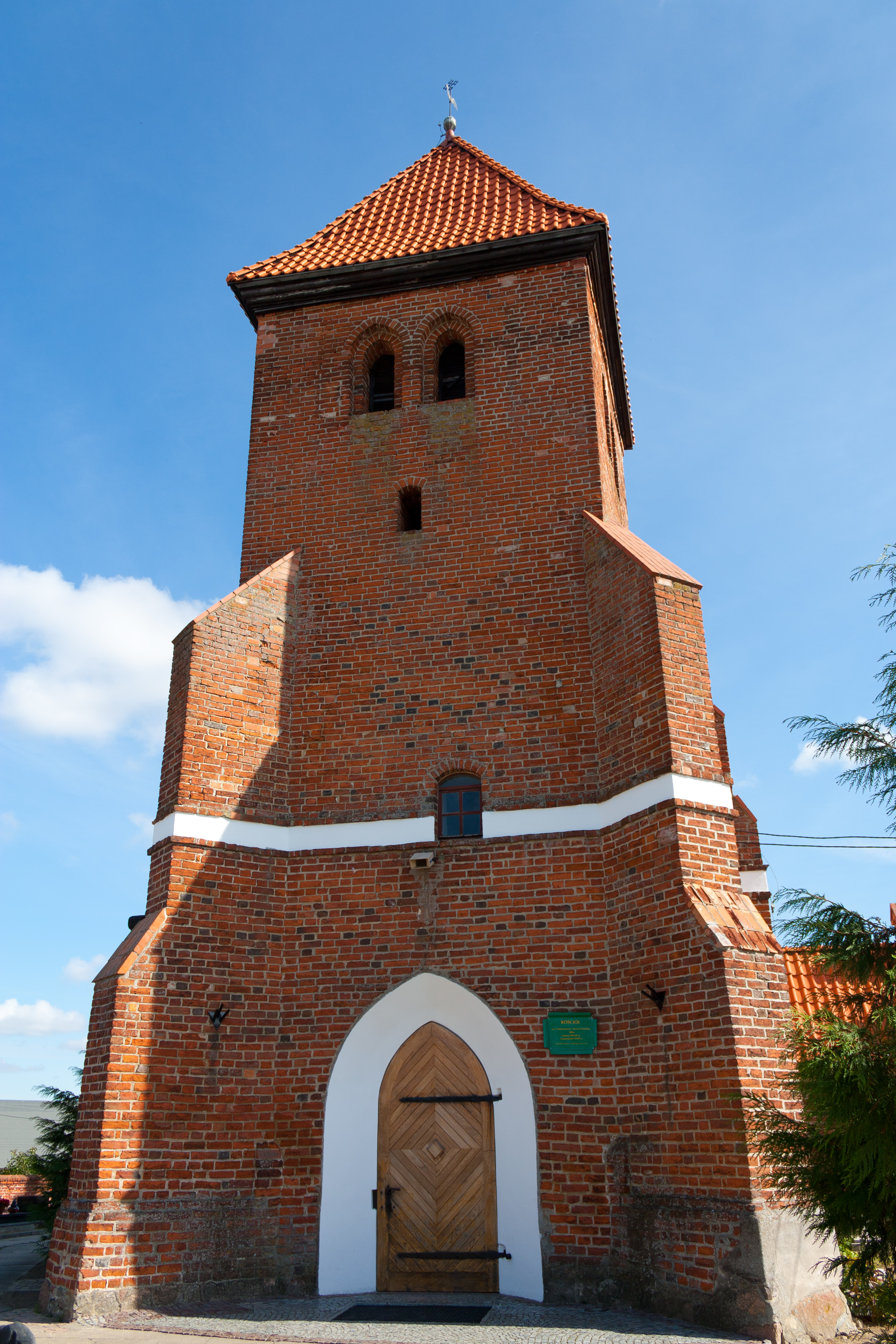
- Exterior of the village church

- Location within Poland
- Coordinates: 53°54′36″N 18°31′27″E
- Country: Poland
- Voivodeship: Pomeranian
- County: Starogard
- Gmina: Starogard Gdański
- Population: 586
- Time zone: UTC+1 (CET)
  - Summer (DST): UTC+2 (CEST)
- Vehicle registration: GST

Dąbrówka [dɔmˈbrufka] is a village in the administrative district of Gmina Starogard Gdański, within Starogard County, Pomeranian Voivodeship, in northern Poland. Dąbrówka is located in the ethnocultural region of Kociewie in the historic region of Pomerania.
