= Trzcińsk =

Village in Pomeranian Voivodeship, Poland

- Village
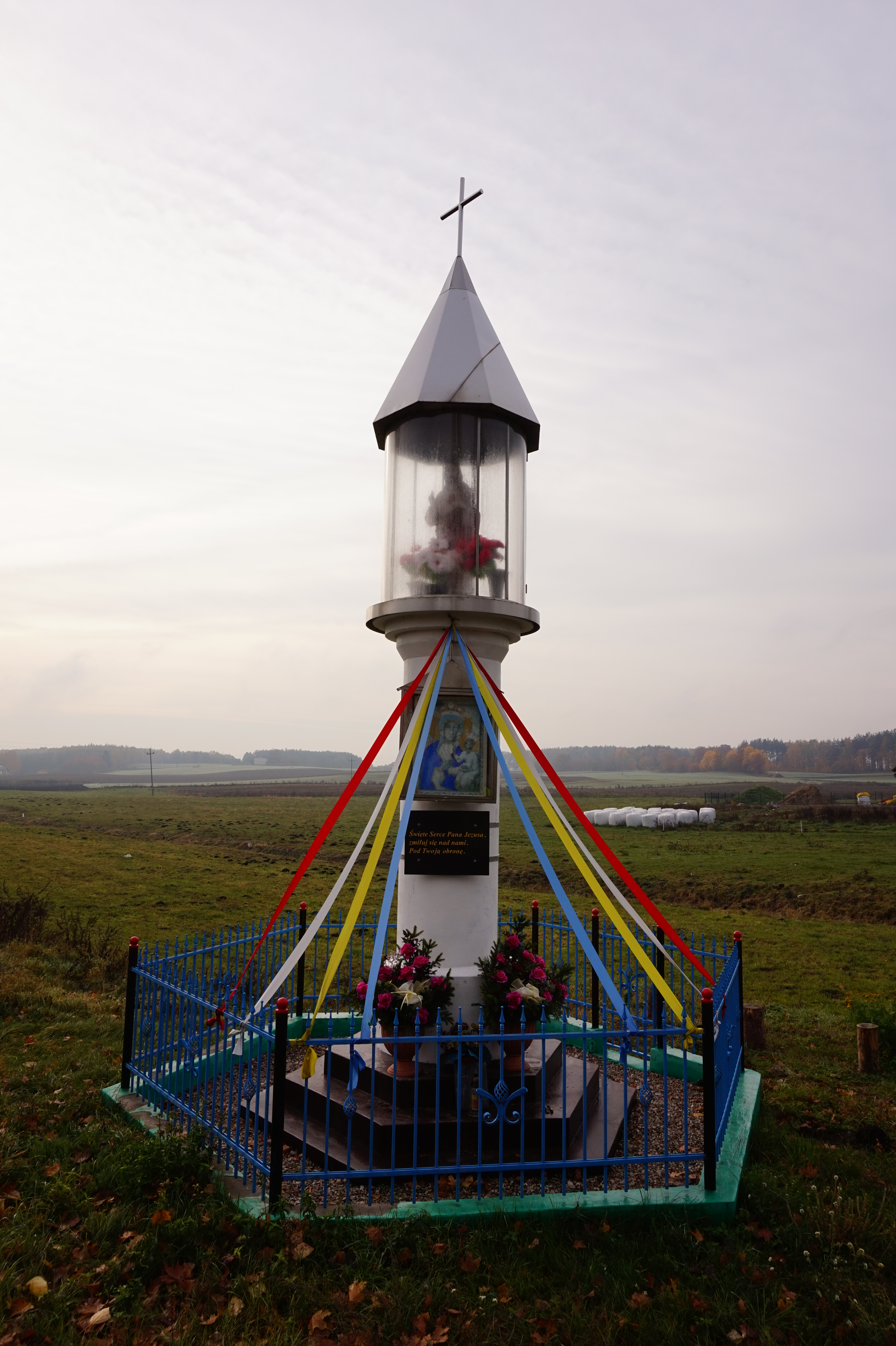
- Chhristian wayside shrine in Trzcińsk

- Location within Poland
- Coordinates: 54°2′51″N 18°32′1″E
- Country: Poland
- Voivodeship: Pomeranian
- County: Starogard
- Gmina: Starogard Gdański

Population
  - Total: 273
- Time zone: UTC+1 (CET)
  - Summer (DST): UTC+2 (CEST)
- Vehicle registration: GST

Trzcińsk [tʂt͡ɕiɲsk] is a village in the administrative district of Gmina Starogard Gdański, within Starogard County, Pomeranian Voivodeship, in northern Poland. It is located in the ethnocultural region of Kociewie in the historic region of Pomerania.

== Notable residents ==
- Erich Mix (1898–1971), German flying ace
