= Janowo, Starogard County =

Village in Pomeranian Voivodeship, Poland

Janowo
- Village
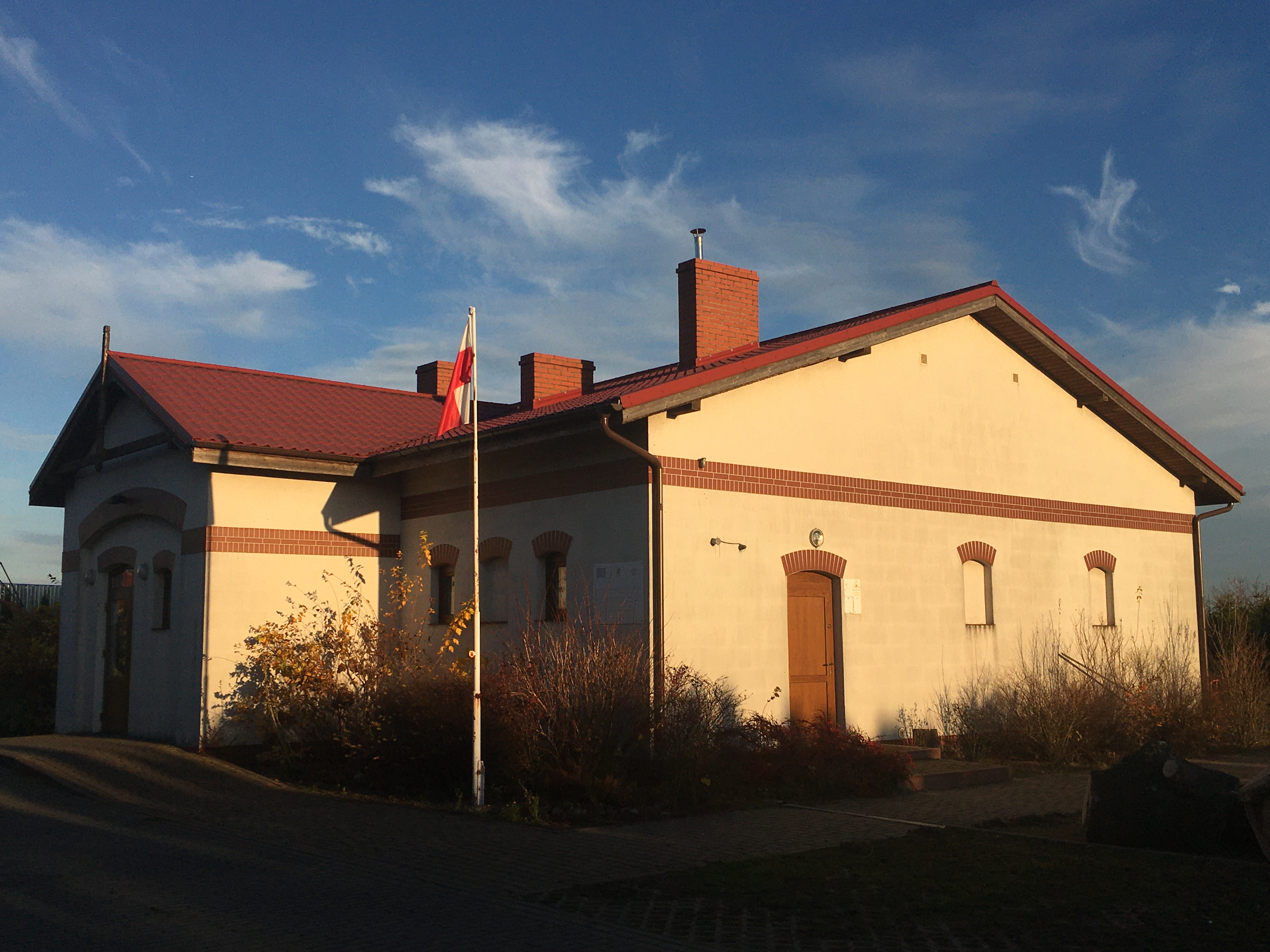

- Location within Poland
- Coordinates: 53°56′36″N 18°33′46″E
- Country: Poland
- Voivodeship: Pomeranian
- County: Starogard
- Gmina: Starogard Gdański
- Population: 253
- Time zone: UTC+1 (CET)
  - Summer (DST): UTC+2 (CEST)
- Vehicle registration: GST

Janowo [jaˈnɔvɔ] is a village in the administrative district of Gmina Starogard Gdański, within Starogard County, Pomeranian Voivodeship, in northern Poland. It is located within the ethnocultural region of Kociewie in the historic region of Pomerania.
