= Szpęgawsk Forest =

1939–1940 Nazi mass murder

Forest of Szpęgawsk Polish: Las Szpęgawski
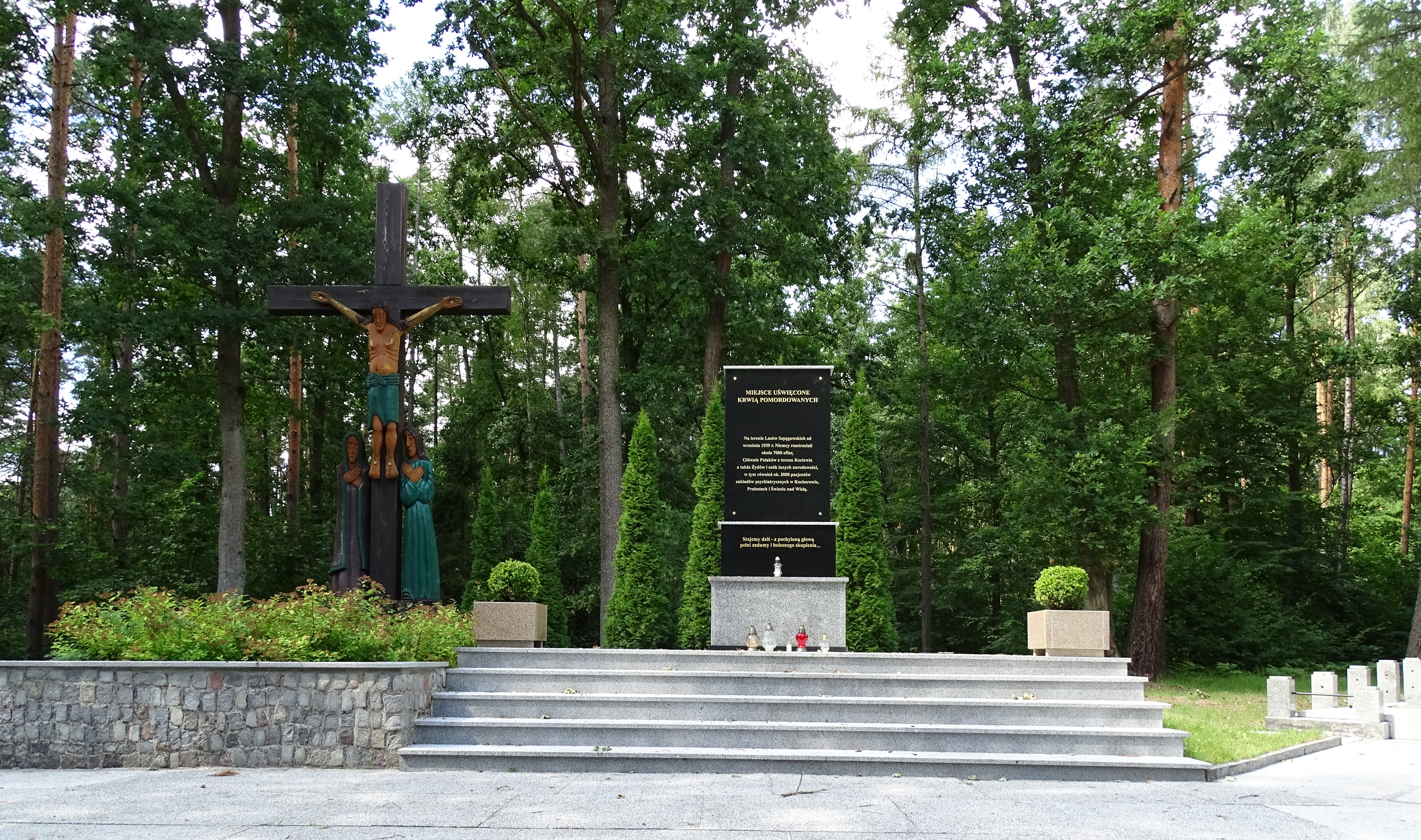
- Monument to Polish civilians murdered in the forest by the Germans in 1939–1941 during World War II
- Interactive map of Forest of Szpęgawsk

Geography
- Location: Starogard County, Pomeranian Voivodeship, Poland

The Forest of Szpęgawsk (Polish: Las Szpęgawski) is situated west of the village of Szpęgawsk in the administrative district of Gmina Starogard Gdański, within Starogard County, Pomeranian Voivodeship, in northern Poland.

Around 5,000-7,000 civilians were killed here between September 1939 and January 1940 during the German occupation of Poland (World War II), mostly by local Germans, members of the Selbstschutz, as part of the wider Intelligenzaktion Pommern. Most of the victims were Polish inhabitants of Pomerania, including many Catholic priests, teachers, school principals, lawyers, doctors, local officials, local activists, merchants, craftsmen, farmers and business people. Some psychiatric hospital patients, Pomeranian Jews and even anti-Nazi Germans were also killed. Among the victims were 1,692 psychiatric hospital patients, including children, from nearby Kocborowo (present-day district of Starogard Gdański), Gniew and Świecie. Also part of the Polish hospital staff was murdered in the forest, while the remaining staff was deported to concentration camps and forced labour in Germany.

39 mass graves have been found.

== Gallery ==
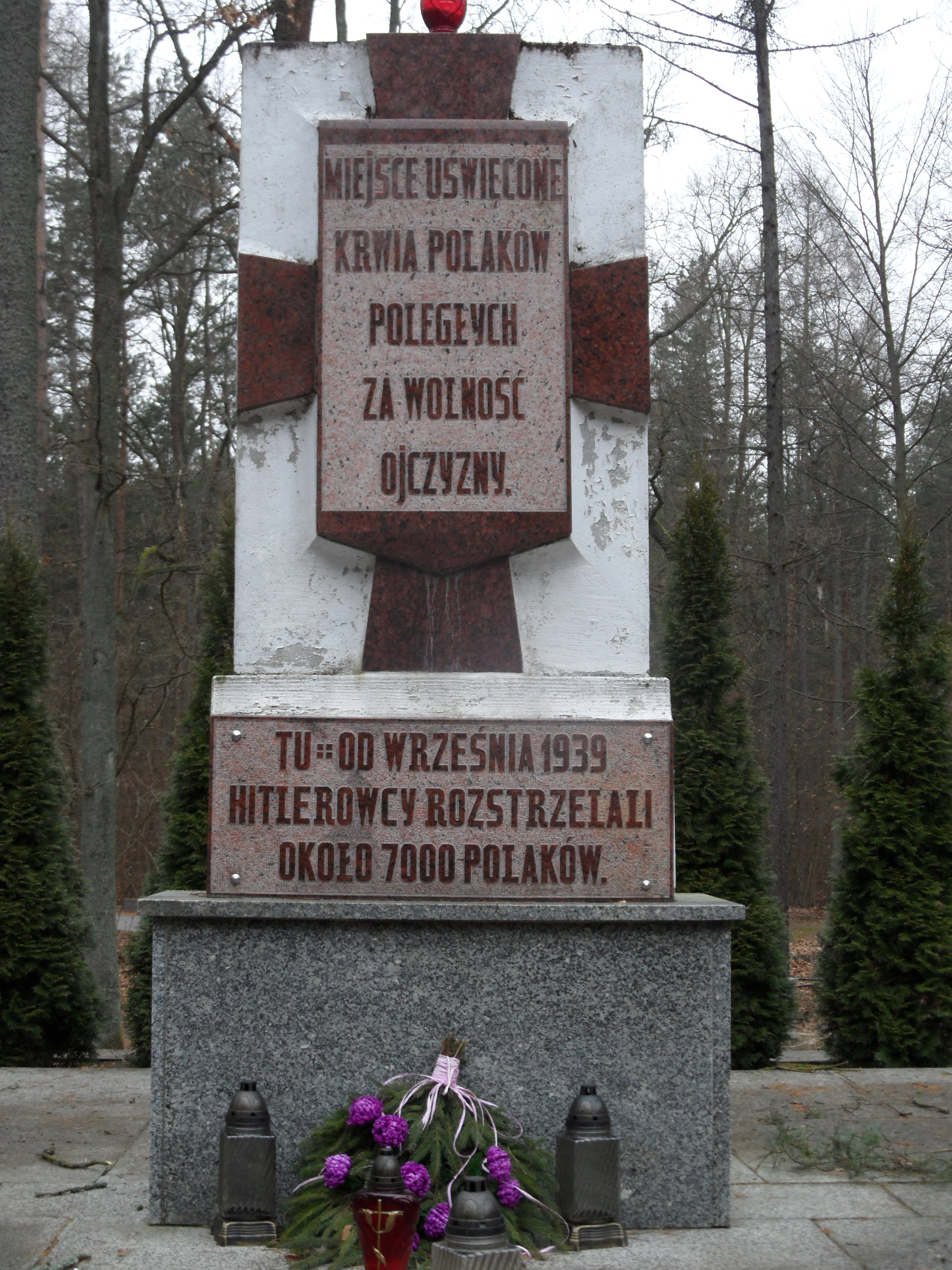
Monument to murdered Poles at the site of the executions

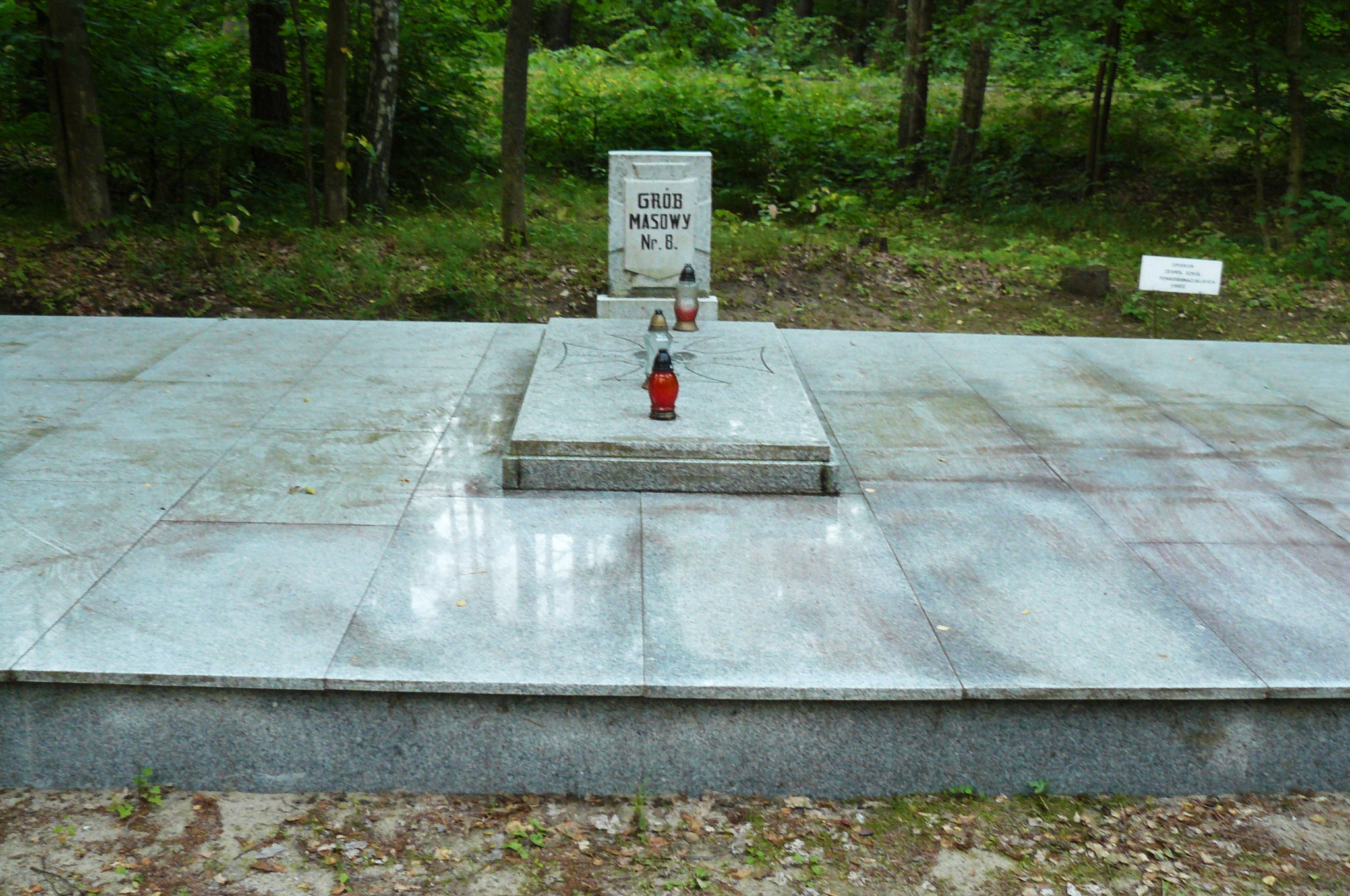
Mass grave No. 8

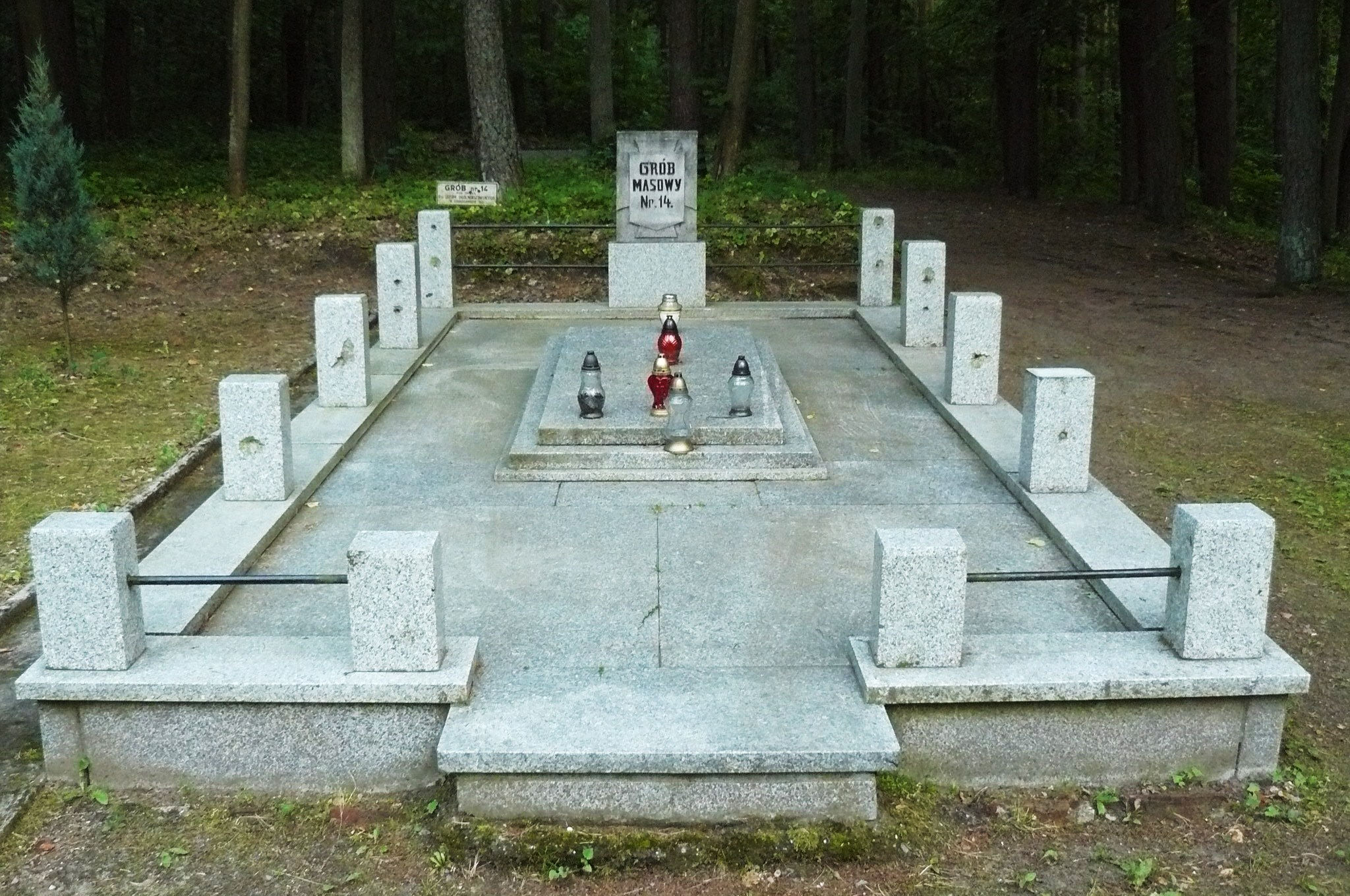
Mass grave No. 14

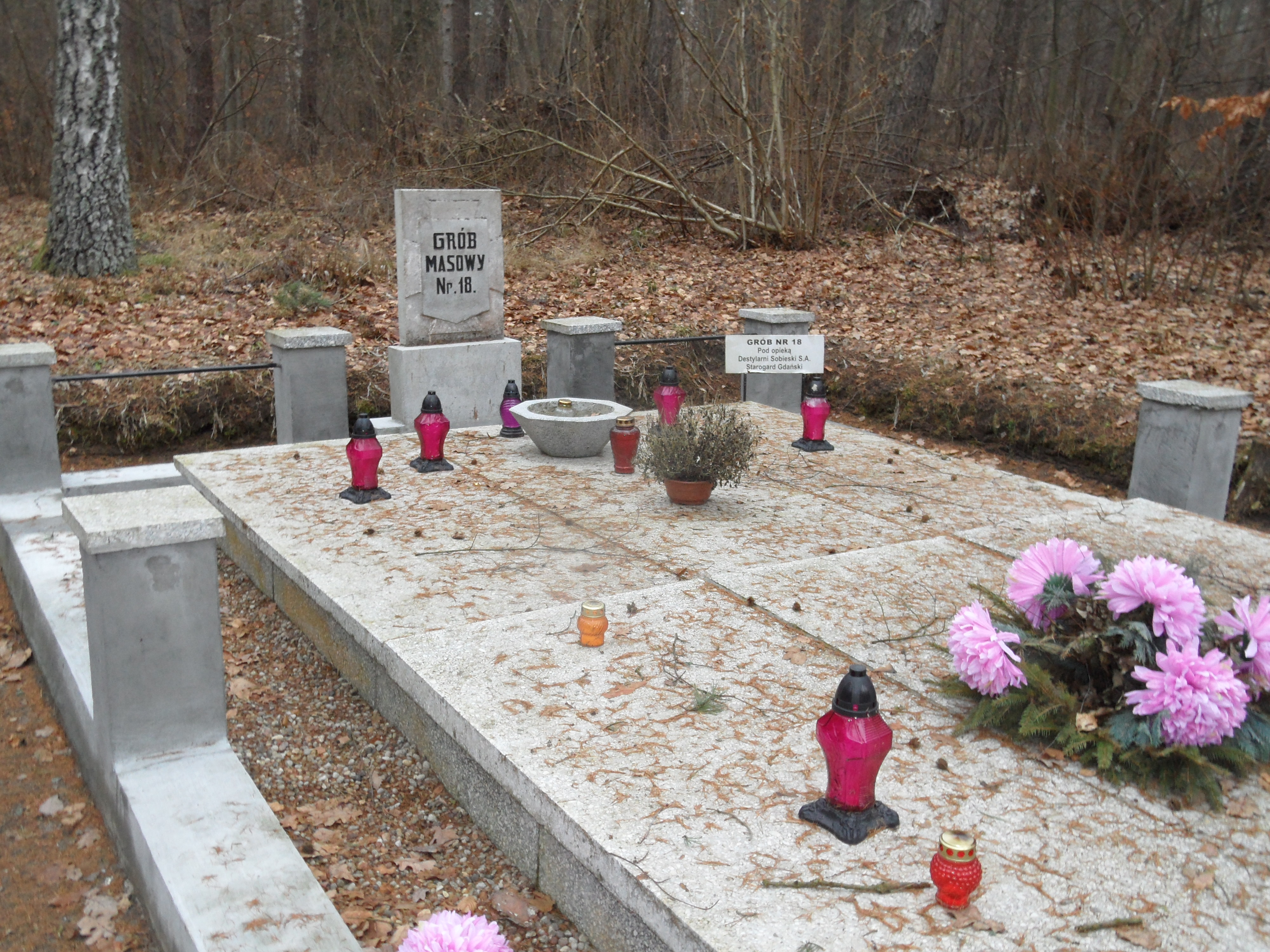
Mass grave No. 18

== See also ==
- Mass murders in Piaśnica
- Action T4
- Piaśnica Wielka
- List of Polish Martyrdom sites
- Anti-Polonism
