= Szpęgawsk =

Village in Pomeranian Voivodeship, Poland

- Village
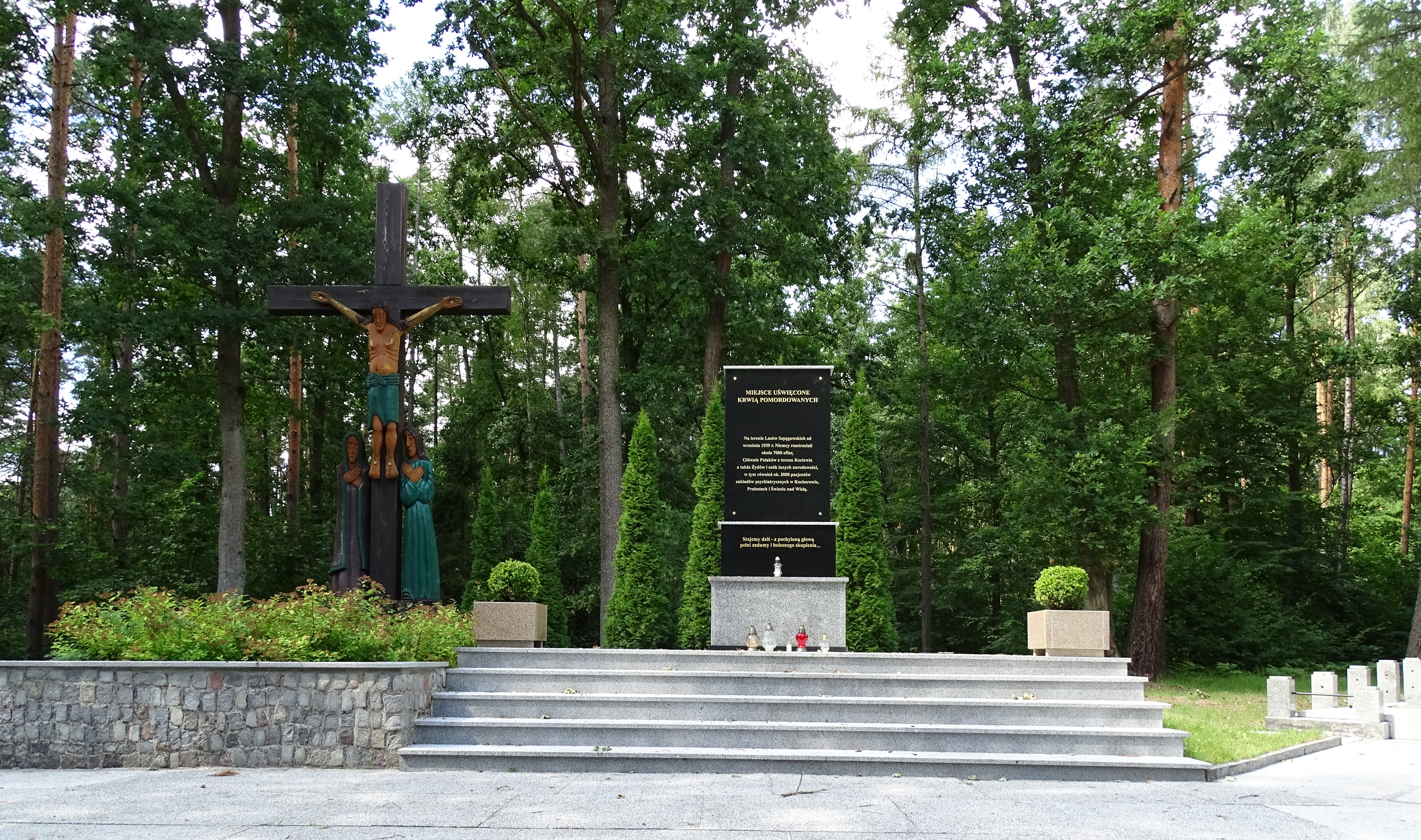
- Monument at the place of execution in Szpęgawsk Forest.

- Location within Poland
- Coordinates: 54°0′17″N 18°36′25″E
- Country: Poland
- Voivodeship: Pomeranian
- County: Starogard
- Gmina: Starogard Gdański

Population
  - Total: 620
- Time zone: UTC+1 (CET)
  - Summer (DST): UTC+2 (CEST)
- Vehicle registration: GST

Szpęgawsk [ˈʂpɛnɡafsk] is a village in the administrative district of Gmina Starogard Gdański, within Starogard County, Pomeranian Voivodeship, in northern Poland. It is located in the ethnocultural region of Kociewie in the historic region of Pomerania.

During the German occupation in World War II, 5,000-7,000 Polish civilians were executed between September 1939 and January 1941 in the Forest of Szpęgawsk (Las Szpęgawski), most of them intellectuals and Jews from Pomerania, and 2000 psychiatric patients from the Kocborowo hospital near Starogard Gdański.

== Notable people ==
- Bogdan Wenta (born 1961), Polish handball player, coach and politician
