= Gmina Starogard Gdański =

Gmina Starogard Gdański Starogard Gdański Commune
- Gmina
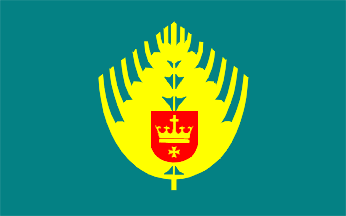
- Flag Coat of arms
- Interactive map of Gmina Starogard Gdański
- Coordinates (Starogard Gdański): 53°58′N 18°32′E
- Country: Poland
- Voivodeship: Pomeranian
- County: Starogard
- Seat: Starogard Gdański

Area
  - Total: 196.16 km^{2} (75.74 sq mi)

Population (2006)
  - Total: 13,676
  - Density: 69.719/km^{2} (180.57/sq mi)
- Website: https://ugstarogard.pl/

Gmina Starogard Gdański is a rural gmina (administrative district) in Starogard County, Pomeranian Voivodeship, in northern Poland. Its seat is the town of Starogard Gdański, although the town is not part of the territory of the gmina.

The gmina covers an area of 196.16 square kilometres (75.7 sq mi), and as of 2006 its total population is 13,676.

== Villages ==
Gmina Starogard Gdański contains the villages and settlements of Barchnowy, Brunswałd, Brzeźno Wielkie, Ciecholewy, Dąbrówka, Helenowo, Jabłowo, Janin, Janowo, Klonówka, Kochanka, Kokoszkowy, Kolincz, Korytyba, Koteże, Krąg, Kręgski Młyn, Linowiec, Lipinki Szlacheckie, Marywil, Najmusy, Nowa Wieś Rzeczna, Okole, Owidz, Owidz-Młyn, Płaczewo, Rokocin, Rywałd, Siwiałka, Stary Las, Sucumin, Sumin, Szpęgawsk, Trzcińsk, Żabno, Zduny and Żygowice.

== Neighbouring gminas ==
Gmina Starogard Gdański is bordered by the town of Starogard Gdański and by the gminas of Bobowo, Lubichowo, Pelplin, Skarszewy, Subkowy, Tczew and Zblewo.
