= Jabłowo =

Village in Pomeranian Voivodeship, Poland

- Village
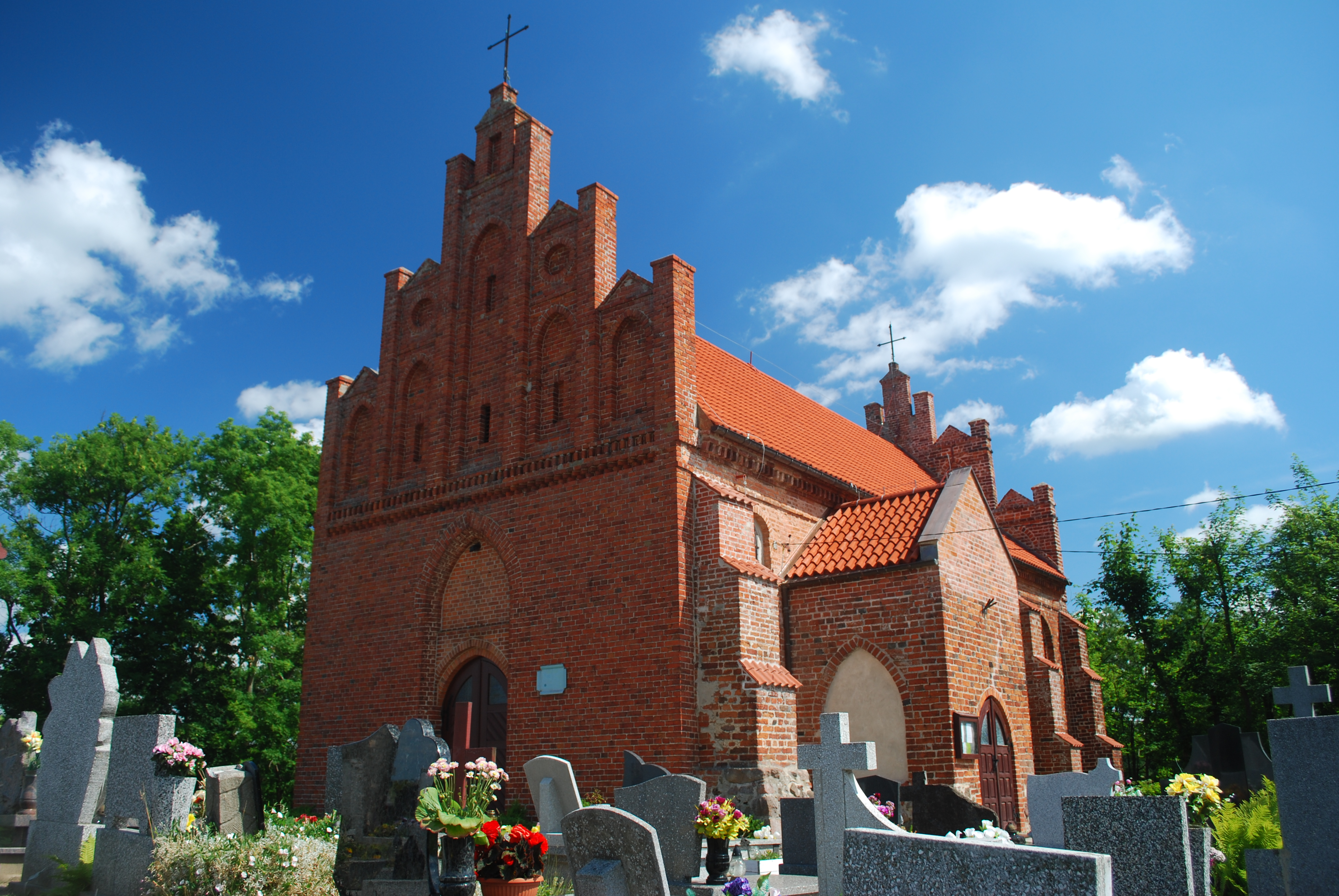
- Saint Lawrence church in Jabłowo

- Location within Poland
- Coordinates: 53°55′33″N 18°34′35″E
- Country: Poland
- Voivodeship: Pomeranian
- County: Starogard
- Gmina: Starogard Gdański
- Population: 803
- Time zone: UTC+1 (CET)
  - Summer (DST): UTC+2 (CEST)
- Vehicle registration: GST

Jabłowo [jaˈbwɔvɔ] is a village in the administrative district of Gmina Starogard Gdański, within Starogard County, Pomeranian Voivodeship, in northern Poland. It is located within the ethnocultural region of Kociewie in the historic region of Pomerania.

== History ==
Jabłowo was a royal village of the Polish Crown, administratively located in the Tczew County in the Pomeranian Voivodeship.

During the German occupation of Poland (World War II), Jabłowo was one of the sites of executions of Poles, carried out by the Germans in 1939 as part of the Intelligenzaktion. Local Poles were also subjected to expulsions to the General Government and deportations to forced labour to German-occupied Grudziądz County.

== Sights ==
The landmark of Jabłowo is the Gothic Saint Lawrence church, which dates back to the 14th century.
