= Kashubian Americans =

Americans of Kashubian birth or descent

Total population
- Less than 300

Regions with significant populations
- Midwest

Languages
- American English, Kashubian, Polish

Religion
- Christianity

Related ethnic groups
- Kashubians (Kashubian diaspora) • Polish Americans

Kashubian Americans (Kashubian: Kaszëbi Amerykansczi) are Americans of Kashubian descent.

== History ==
The two earliest Kashubian American settlements in the United States were centered around Winona, Minnesota, and Portage County, Wisconsin. The Winona settlement included the Minnesota town of Pine Creek and the Wisconsin towns of Dodge, Fountain City, and Trempealeau. The Portage County settlement included the Wisconsin towns of Hull, Polonia, and Sharon. The Winona settlement is traditionally dated to 1855, but actually began in 1859. The Portage County settlement can be definitively traced back to 1858. Winona is dubbed the "Kashubian Capital of America" because of the large population of Kashubians there.

After the American Civil War and the German Kulturkampf from 1848 to 1884, Kashubians emigrated to the United States in three waves through the Kashubian region. While some headed for the Winona area and for Portage County, many Kashubians wound up living in major urban centers such as Buffalo, Detroit, Chicago, and Milwaukee. A smaller number of Kashubians settled in small farming communities scattered throughout Minnesota, North Dakota, and Montana. By the turn of the century, Kashubian Americans tended to identify themselves completely as Polish Americans, although in Winona at least the Kashubian language would survive for another generation or two.

== Notable people ==
- Paul Breza
- Jan Romuald Byzewski
- Jozef Cieminski
- Hieronim Derdowski
- Antoni Klawiter
- Jakub W.J. Pacholski
- Anne Pellowski
- Paul Peter Rhode

== See also ==
- Kashubian Diaspora
