= History of Winona, Minnesota =

The history of Winona, Minnesota as a settlement begins with the foundation in 1851 in what was then Minnesota Territory on the West side of the Mississippi River. The site was of the village of Keoxa of Dakota people. But the name "Keoxa" is known only from one non-contemporary source, Edward Duffield Neill's The history of Minnesota—from the earliest French explorations to the present times. According to Neill, "Keoxa" best translated to "Homestead", and the name comes from annual ceremonial gatherings held there to honor the dead. The French knew the areas as La Prairie Aux-Ailes. The first American visitors called it Wahpasha's Prairie. The name "Winona" (Wee-no-nah) was noted to be the name of a first-born daughter in the local Dakota language.

The original plat of the city is located on a sand bar of the Mississippi River and surrounded by river bottoms and wooded bluff lands. Evidence gathered by archaeologists indicates that people lived in the valley as early as 9500 B.C. The earliest evidence of human habitation in Winona County is based on the discovery of a Woodland period site (circa 800 B.C.-900 A.D.).

Winona was platted and settled in 1851. The railroad crossing of the Mississippi by bridge happened in 1871. Industrial development and the growth of the port of Winona continued through the 19th and 20th centuries.

== Early geology and the Mississippi River ==
The Glacial River Warren drained Lake Agassiz in central North America between about 13,500 and 10,650 BP calibrated (11,700 and 9,400 ^{14}C uncalibrated) years ago. The river valley became too wide for the stream, and filled with glacial sediment to form the floodplain. The Trempealeau River empties into the river just below the Winona plain.

== Native Americans ==
The present-day city of Winona was founded on the village of Keoxa. As the seat of the Wapasha dynasty, it was home to a Mdewakanton band of the eastern Sioux. The summer homes of the Keoxa natives were made of bark supported by a framework and poles. Their winter residence was a teepee made of about 8 buffalo hides sewn together with deer sinew, typically about 12 feet (3.7 m) high and 10 to 12 feet (3.0 to 3.7 m) in diameter, with a fire in the middle to keep the temperature inside the dwelling tolerable even in the coldest weather.

== European American settlement ==
Valley of the Mississippi from Winona, circa 1898

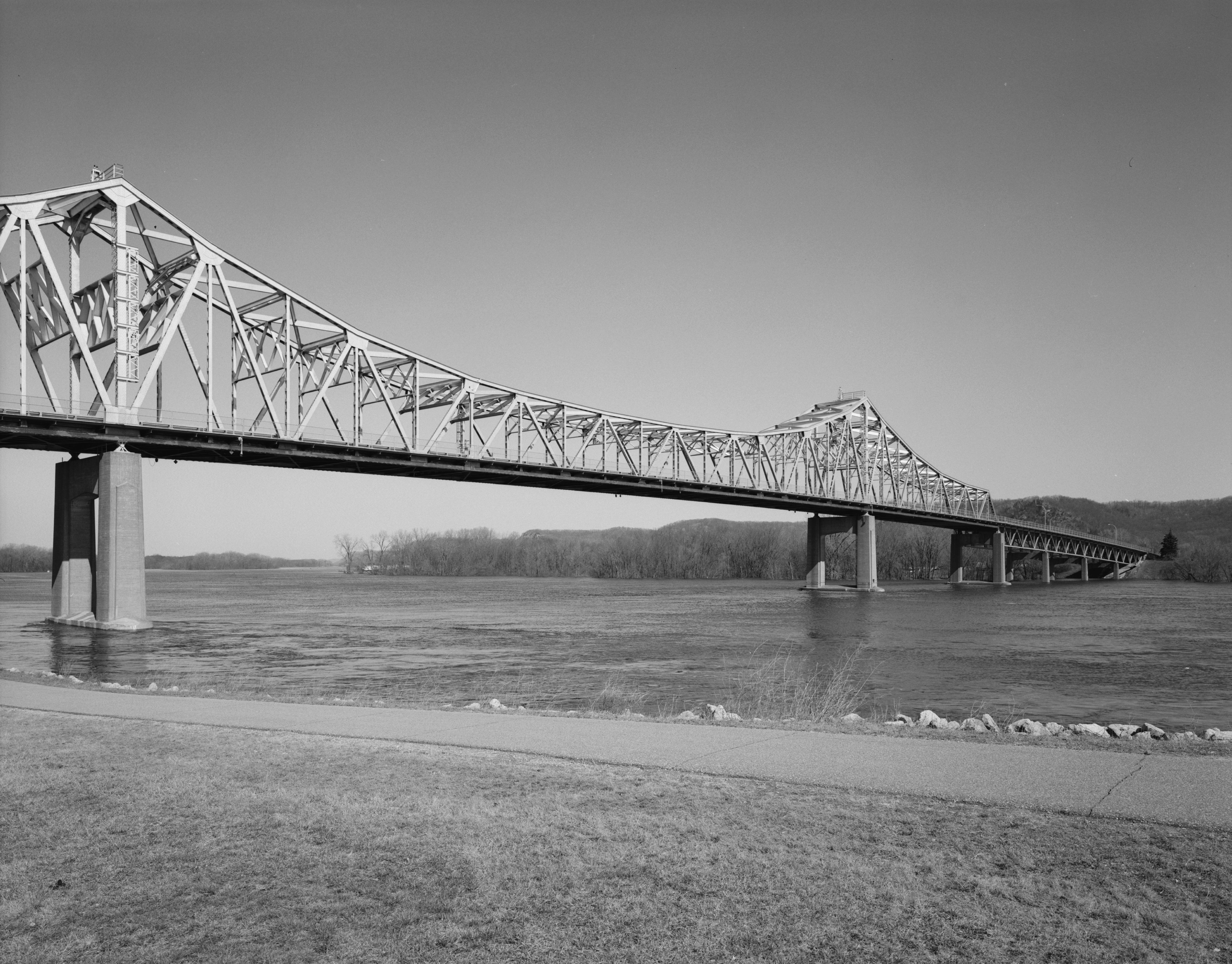
Main Channel Bridge, built in 1942

Historical population
Census	Pop.	Note	%±
1860	2,464		—
1870	7,192		191.9%
1880	10,208		41.9%
1890	18,208		78.4%
1900	19,714		8.3%
1910	18,583		−5.7%
1920	19,143		3.0%
1930	20,850		8.9%
1940	22,490		7.9%
1950	25,031		11.3%
1960	24,895		−0.5%
1970	26,438		6.2%
1980	25,075		−5.2%
1990	25,399		1.3%
2000	27,069		6.6%
2010	27,592		1.9%
2017 (est.)	26,928		−2.4%
U.S. Decennial Census; 2015 Estimate

Lieutenant Zebulon Pike left Fort Bellefontaine on August 9, 1805, with orders to find the source of the Mississippi. On September 14, 1805, he reached the Mississippi River near island number 72 (on his map), which would one day be Winona and recorded his impressions in his log. Pike's journal has the first mention of the legendary Winona, a young Dakota woman who chose death over an unwanted suitor. The name derives from the Dakota word we-no-nah "first-born daughter"

In 1851, Pike's island 72 was selected by Captain Orrin Smith as a townsite on the west bank of the Mississippi River. For over 25 years, Smith had sailed the river between Galena, Illinois and Fort Snelling, now in Minnesota, as owner and pilot of the river packet Nominee. Smith learned that the treaties of Traverse des Sioux and of Mendota would establish a reservation in the interior of the state, and realized that there would be a rush to develop townsites on the east side of the river. On October 15, 1851, Smith landed his ship's carpenter, Mr. Erwin Johnson, and two other men (Smith and Stevens) with the purpose of claiming title to the riverfront and surrounding prairie land. When the town site was surveyed and plotted in 1852 by John Ball, United States deputy surveyor, it was given the name of "Montezuma", as requested by Johnson and Smith. Henry D. Huff bought an interest in the town site in 1853 and, with the consent of Smith, changed the name to Winona.

The town expanded rapidly in the 19th century. The original settlers were old stock Yankee immigrants from New England. The population increased from 815 in December, 1855, to 3,000 in December, 1856. In 1856 German immigrants arrived as well. The Germans and the Yankees worked together planting trees and building businesses based on lumber, wheat, steamboating and railroads. Together, they were so successful that for a time Winona had more millionaires than any other city of its size in the United States. In 1860 Winona had a population of 2,456, and was third largest city in Minnesota until the late 1880s. Part of the surge in population in 1856 was that land claims became legal in 1855 with the completion of land surveys and the opening of a local federal land office. It was incorporated as a city in 1857.

1859 marked the arrival of Winona's first Kashubian Polish family, the Bronks. So many more Kashubians followed them that Winona became the largest American center of the Kashubian diaspora. At the turn of the 19th century, by estimate of the Kashubian poet Hieronim Derdowski, who settled in Winona and edited the newspaper Wiarus, 4,000 of Winona's 5,000 Poles (out of its total population of nearly 20,000) were Kashubians, earning it the title of "Kashubian Capital of America." As Winona's Kashubians became more acclimated to American society, they came to identify with the far more numerous Polish Americans. Only recently, due to the efforts of the Polish Cultural Institute and Museum, has Winona's Kashubian culture begun to be reclaimed.

== Industrial development ==
Growth in Winona was built on a railway and steamboat transportation system, wheat milling, and lumber. In 1856 over 1,300 steamboats stopped at Winona.

The Winona and St. Peter Railroad first 11 miles (18 km) from Winona to Stockton, Minnesota, were completed by the end of 1862, making it the second operational railroad in Minnesota, after the St. Paul and Pacific Line from Saint Paul to St. Anthony Falls. In 1863, Stephen Miller attempted to convince President Abraham Lincoln to approve the construction of a national hospital in Winona, however the proposal was denied on the basis that the city was not accessible by railroad in the winter. In December 1870, the Mississippi River was bridged at Winona by the Winona Rail Bridge. In 1867 the Chicago and Northwestern Railway Company purchased the controlling shares in the Winona and St Peter.

The railway system grew and the Winona Green Bay and Western Rail Bridge, built of steel and iron with a steam-powered swingspan over the river, was the second railway bridge to span the Mississippi at Winona. The first train crossed on July 4, 1891, and the bridge served the Green Bay & Western (GBW) and Burlington Route for the next 94 years until it was closed in 1985 and dismantled in the fall of 1990. In 1892, a wagon toll-bridge over the Mississippi, a steel high-bridge, was completed and remained in service until 1942.

During the 1860s southern Minnesota was the greatest wheat-producing region in the country and Winona was the main port for shipping Minnesota wheat. By 1870, Winona was the fourth largest wheat shipping port in the United States. In 1899, Bay State Milling was founded, and is still in operation today. John Laird started the first lumber mill in 1855; he later was joined by his cousins James and Matthew Norton in founding the Laird-Norton Co. The Winona sawmills reached their peak production in 1892 when they produced over 160 million board feet (380,000 m^{3}) annually and ranked eighth in production of lumber in the upper Midwest.

== Millionaires and musicians ==
A famous resident of Winona was J. R. Watkins, the man who invented the "money-back guarantee" in 1868 when he started Watkins Incorporated. In the early 1900s, he renamed the company the J. R. Watkins Medical Company. He died before the completion of the company's current factory and offices in 1911. Now called J. R. Watkins Incorporated, it is one of the oldest companies in the nation. The company also trades in Canada, China and as of May 2009 in the United Kingdom as Watkins UK. The company museum and factory are open for visitation and touring 6 days a week.

For a decade (1907–1917) Winona was home to pioneer American composer Carl Ruggles. Carl (Charles Sprague) Ruggles was born in East Marion, Massachusetts, on March 11, 1876. Trained as a violinist, he also studied theory and composition in Boston with Josef Claus and John Knowles Paine. (Plans to study composition with Dvorak in Prague were put off when a financial sponsor died). In 1907, he moved to Winona, where he founded, and for a decade conducted, the Winona Symphony. He also gave lessons, composed, and began painting during this time. Ruggles is often referred to together with composer Charles Ives.

In 1947 the Edstrom brothers (Harold and Everett), along with fellow musician Roger Busdicker, founded the Hal Leonard Corporation, currently the largest publisher of sheet music in the world.

Winona's population reached 19,714 in 1900, but thereafter declined for some years after the collapse of the lumber industry. There are numerous entries on the National Register of Historic Places listings in Winona County, Minnesota. The City of Winona has two historic districts on the National Register of Historic Places: the Winona Commercial Historic District and East Second Street Commercial Historic District. They are combined into a single local historic district administered by the city's Heritage Preservation Commission.
