= Wiele, Pomeranian Voivodeship =

Wiele Wielé
- Village
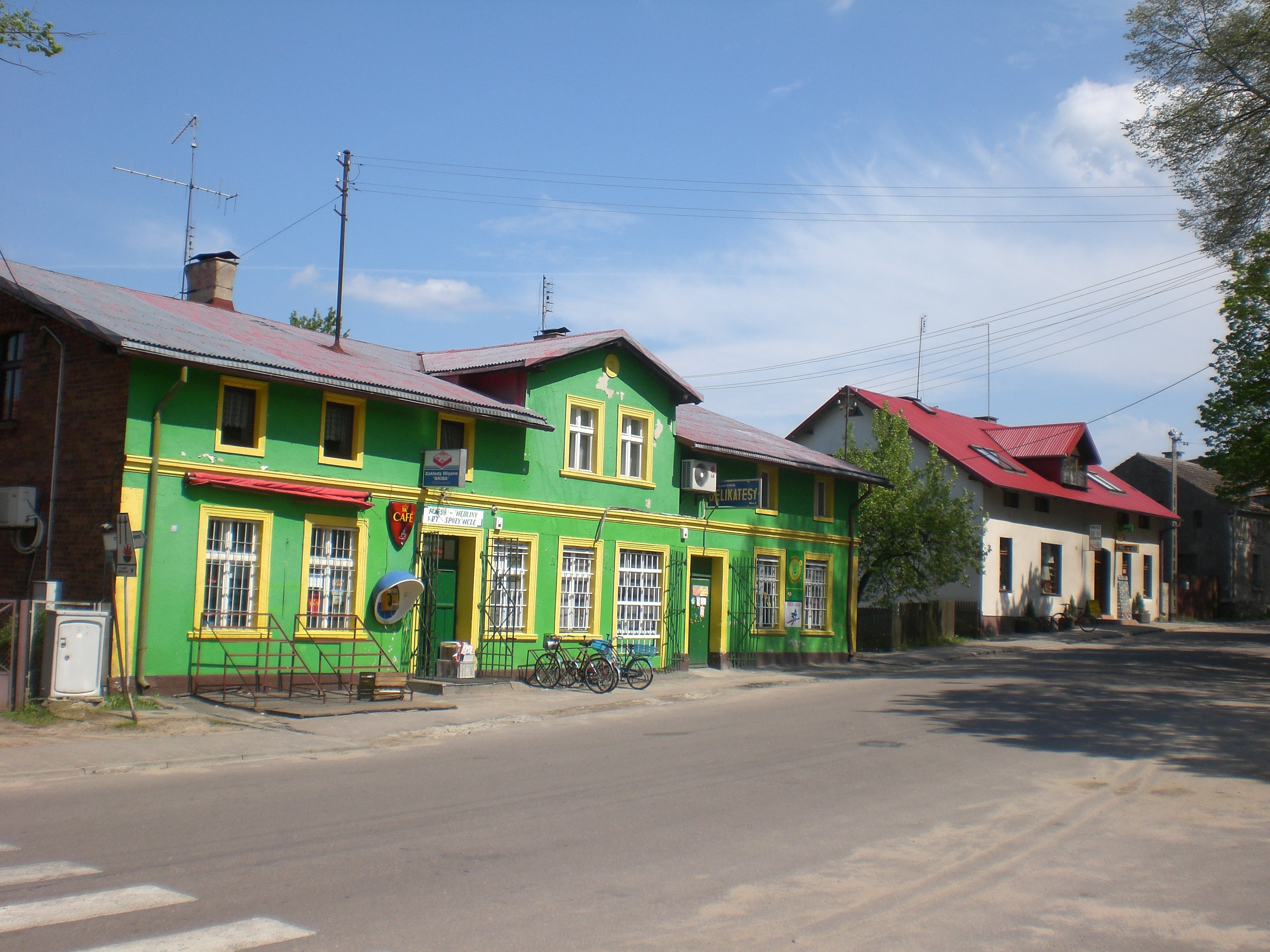

- Location within Poland
- Coordinates: 53°55′24″N 17°51′43″E
- Country: Poland
- Voivodeship: Pomeranian
- County: Kościerzyna
- Gmina: Karsin
- Population: 1,175
- Time zone: UTC+1 (CET)
  - Summer (DST): UTC+2 (CEST)
- Vehicle registration: GKS

Wiele [ˈvʲɛlɛ] (Kashubian: Wielé) is a village in the administrative district of Gmina Karsin, within Kościerzyna County, Pomeranian Voivodeship, in northern Poland. It is located in the Zabor Land, a southern part of the ethnocultural region of Kashubia in the historic region of Pomerania.

== History ==
The village was already established as early as 1300. The area is hampered by poor, sandy soil, which is why the primary crops are rye, hay and potatoes. Wiele was a royal village of the Polish Crown, administratively located in the Tuchola County in the Pomeranian Voivodeship. It was annexed by Prussia in the First Partition of Poland in 1772. In 1800 there was a church, saw-mill, bakery and flour mill which defined the village. In 1835, 36 farmers were liberated from serfdom under Prussian law and a few farms were established. From 1871 the village was part of the German Empire and then it was restored to Poland, after it regained independence following World War I in 1918. The area is the home of farmers and artisans.

== Sights and culture ==
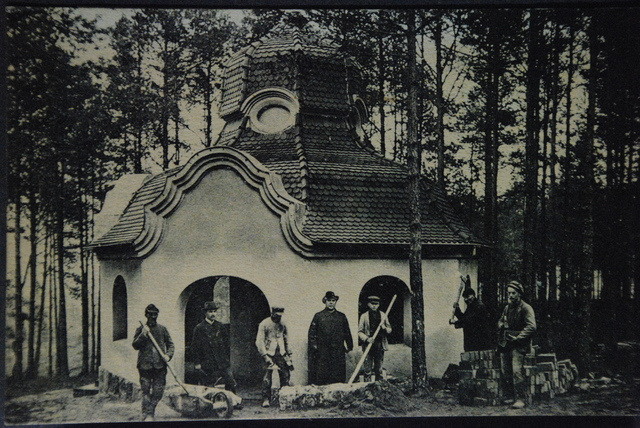
Construction of the Wiele Calvary in the early 20th century

The museum of Zaborland lies here, displaying local folk art and contemporary Kruban artistry. The greatest attraction in the area is the Wiele Calvary with station chapels built in 1915.

== Kashubian Emigration to America ==
Beginning in the late 1850s, many families from Wiele emigrated to the area of Winona, Minnesota in the United States. The most famous of Winona's immigrants from Wiele was Hieronim Derdowski, famed Kashubian poet and, after emigration to the US, editor of the Winona Polish-language newspaper Wiarus. Many also travelled to Wilno, Ontario, Canada and the Brudenell Township.
