= Wiarus =

Former Polish language newspaper in the US

- "God Save Polonia"
- Type: Weekly newspaper
- Format: Standard Polish (Warsaw/Cracow dialect)
- Owner(s): Wiarus stock company (1886–1889); Franciszek Gryglaszewski (1889); Hieronim Derdowski (1889–1902); Joanna Derdowski (1902–1915)
- Publisher: Hieronim Derdowski
- President: Rev. Jan Byzewski (Founder)
- Editor-in-chief: Hieronim Derdowski (1886–1902)
- Editor: Frank Drazkowski (Issues 1–3); Antoni Paryski (Issues 4–10)
- Founded: February 11, 1886
- Ceased publication: December 17, 1919
- Relaunched: 1895 (reverted from Katolik)
- Political alignment: Polish-American interests, Roman Catholic
- Language: Polish
- Headquarters: Winona, Minnesota
- City: Winona
- Country: United States

Wiarus (transl. Veteran Defender) was the name of a Polish-language newspaper published in Winona, Minnesota from 1886 to 1893 and 1895 to 1919; in 1893 it was renamed Katolik, but reverted to its original name in 1895. Although Winona's Polish community was known at the time as the "Kashubian Capital of America," Wiarus was published in the standard Polish spoken in Warsaw and Cracow. Wiarus also provided printing services for Winona's Kashubian Polish community. From 1886 to 1902, Wiarus was edited by the famed Kashubian-born poet and journalist Hieronim Derdowski. In its heyday, Wiarus was said to be the most widely circulated Polish-language newspaper in the United States.

== Establishment ==
The first edition of Wiarus is dated February 11, 1886, but at least one authoritative contemporary source gives Wiarus a starting date of 1885. The date of 1885 must certainly refer to the discussions culminating in the foundation of Wiarus. Led by the pastor, Reverend Jan Romuald Byzewski, Kashubian Poles from Winona's Saint Stanislaus Kostka Parish pooled their resources to start a newspaper which would represent the interests of Winona's Kashubian Poles, at both the local and national levels. Two Winona Polish papers, Przyjaciel Ludu (transl. People's Friend) and Kurjer Winonski (transl. Winona Courier) had already failed. The Winona Daily Republican for February 18, 1886 states that officers of the Wiarus stock company were: Reverend Jan Byzewski, president; John B. Bambenek, vice-president; V.A. Lorbiecki, secretary; Frank Drazkowski, treasurer. The founders selected the title Wiarus to reflect the paper's values, as expressed below:

Our slogan is 'God Save Polonia.' Under this slogan we wish to unify our forces so as to be firm against our adversities, to preserve our holy faith in its purest form, to save our ethnic traditions, to educate our youth, and to secure for ourselves a respectable position in the United States in political and ethnic fields.

The first three issues of Wiarus were edited by Frank Drazkowski, the fourth through the tenth by Antoni Paryski (also called Parisso or Parek). Paryski is regarded by Winona historians to have been some kind of a Russian spy, but, in fact, later founded the influential Toledo-based newspaper Ameryka-Echo, which survived until 1971. Heated allegations such as this were typical of that day's Polish-language press, as editors competed for influence and subscribers among a Polish American community just beginning to recognize its own strength. The third and most famous editor of Wiarus, Hieronim Derdowski, was no stranger to controversy either. Better known (then and now) as an influential Kashubian and Polish poet, Derdowski emigrated to the United States in 1885 and had already worn out his welcome at two Detroit newspapers: the socialist Gazeta Narodowa and the Polish Roman Catholic Union of America (PRCUA)-supported Pielgrzym Polski. Evidently, he had not been the first choice of Wiarus's editorial board, even though he had expressed interest and his fellow-Kashubian Father Byzewski must have known about him at least by reputation. But with the eleventh issue of Wiarus, a new era began.

== Derdowski takes charge ==
Given free rein by Wiarus's editorial board, Derdowski assumed his editorial duties with great relish. The editorial board sold Wiarus to Franciszek Gryglaszewski of Minneapolis, censor of the Polish National Alliance. On January 19, 1889, Derdowski bought the newspaper from Gryglaszewski for $3,000, becoming both editor and publisher. Practically nothing escaped Derdowski's attention. He took an interest in both local and national Polish affairs, including developments in what was once Poland. Although himself of Kashubian birth, he took great pride in the quality of his own Polish prose. He also gave himself credit for teaching the Kashubians of Winona "proper Polish," and for a while published a supplement called Kosciuszko for younger Polish American readers. As late as Spring 1892, Wiarus enjoyed the good esteem of the PRCUA, to judge from the Dziennik Chicagoski of March 3, 1892:

Unfortunately for Derdowski, he was not a very good businessman. His side ventures as a travel agent and printer did not bring much money, and circulation was therefore always a problem. His own personality gravitated toward the sensational, and if he could channel this into his family business, so much the better. This tactic, however, caused more insult than it did profit. That said, Wiarus performed a unique and important role in America's Polish-language press, not only representing the entire Polish community of the state of Minnesota, but serving as a clearing-house for communication between small Polish communities throughout Minnesota and the Dakotas.

== Katolik ==
Beginning with the June 1, 1893 issue and ending with the August 1, 1895, the name of the paper was changed to Katolik. Some sort of realignment was involved, but it is difficult to tell precisely what. The Katolik contained some interesting things. On page 5 of the February 22, 1894 edition of Katolik appeared an "Oda Perhamska" - a paean to the Polish people of Perham, Minnesota. Apparently the change involved more than poetry: Dziennik Chicagoski for March 25, 1895 records a demonstration at Saint Stanislaus Kostka Parish of Chicago against Katolik and another Polish-language paper referred to as Kropidlo. The April 8 Dziennik Chicagoski represents a similar demonstration by Chicago's Saint John Kantius Parish.

Katolik was also heavily involved in the local uproar at Winona's Saint Stanislaus Kostka Parish. Father Byzewski's 1890 departure as pastor set in motion a test of wills between the local Kashubian community and Rev. Joseph B. Cotter, first bishop of the newly (1889) erected Diocese of Winona. There was a revolving door of pastors, including one Father Konstantin Domagalski, who had written for Wiarus under the name of Cyrulik (transl. The Barber) and Father Antoni Klawiter, who would eventually part ways with the Roman Catholic Church and become an "independent" priest. The uproar ended in 1894 when Bishop Cotter appointed Father Jakub W.J. Pacholski as pastor. From that point Father Pacholski ran Saint Stanislaus - and, indeed, Winona's Kashubian community - with a firm hand until his death in 1932. It is quite likely, pace Ochrymowycz, that Father Pacholski was responsible for changing the name from Katolik back to Wiarus, and not the other way around.

== Decline and fall ==
A year or so after changing his newspaper's name back to Wiarus, it would appear that Derdowski suffered a stroke. A March 26, 1897 article from Narod Polski, the PRCUA's national newspaper, shows that he retained his power to offend:

It would be impossible for such as Jutrzenka, Glos Ludu, Wiarus, Nowe Zycie, Sztandarek and others to exist in Europe. Not only the government but the public would condemn them.

But Derdowski had lost his edge. Constant exposure to the high-pressure polemic of America's Polish-language newspaper world and the pressures of providing for his family took its toll on his health. Sadly, Derdowski's death on August 13, 1902 was scarcely even noticed by the Winona newspapers, although remarked by others. After Derdowski's death, Wiarus lost most of its national prominence, although it still sold quite well in Minnesota and in the Dakotas.

Derdowski's widow, Joanna, kept up the good fight, running Wiarus until 1915, when she sold the newspaper. Wiarus suspended publication on December 17, 1919. A complete set of bound volumes of Wiarus and Katolik was preserved by John C. Bambenek, the newspaper's last business manager and later, Winona County Treasurer. By courtesy of the Bambenek family, these bound volumes were microfilmed by the Minnesota Historical Society and now reside at the Polish Cultural Institute and Museum in Winona.
