= Jozef Cieminski =

American priest

Józef Franciszek Darzyn Ciemiński (Borzyszkowy, 4 August 1867 – Winona, 1959) was a Polish-born Roman Catholic priest. He emigrated with his parents to the United States in 1881 and was ordained as a Priest in Saint Paul, Minnesota in 1895. He was involved with numerous Polish Catholic parishes during his lifetime including the now closed troubled Parish of Saints Peter and Paul in Duluth, Minnesota, and the parish of Holy Cross in Minneapolis.

== Biography ==
He was born in the Kaszubian village of Borzyszkowy, near Bytow. He was the first of ten children born to Franciszek and Maryanna Darzyn Cieminski, who emigrated from Prussian Poland (Kashubia) to the United States in 1881 aboard the paddle steamer Grimsby, which made him a participant in the Kashubian diaspora. The peasant boy's fifty-one years as a Roman Catholic priest would take him from the post of archdiocesan Secretary to the rectory of a Polish colony on the Minnesota frontier.

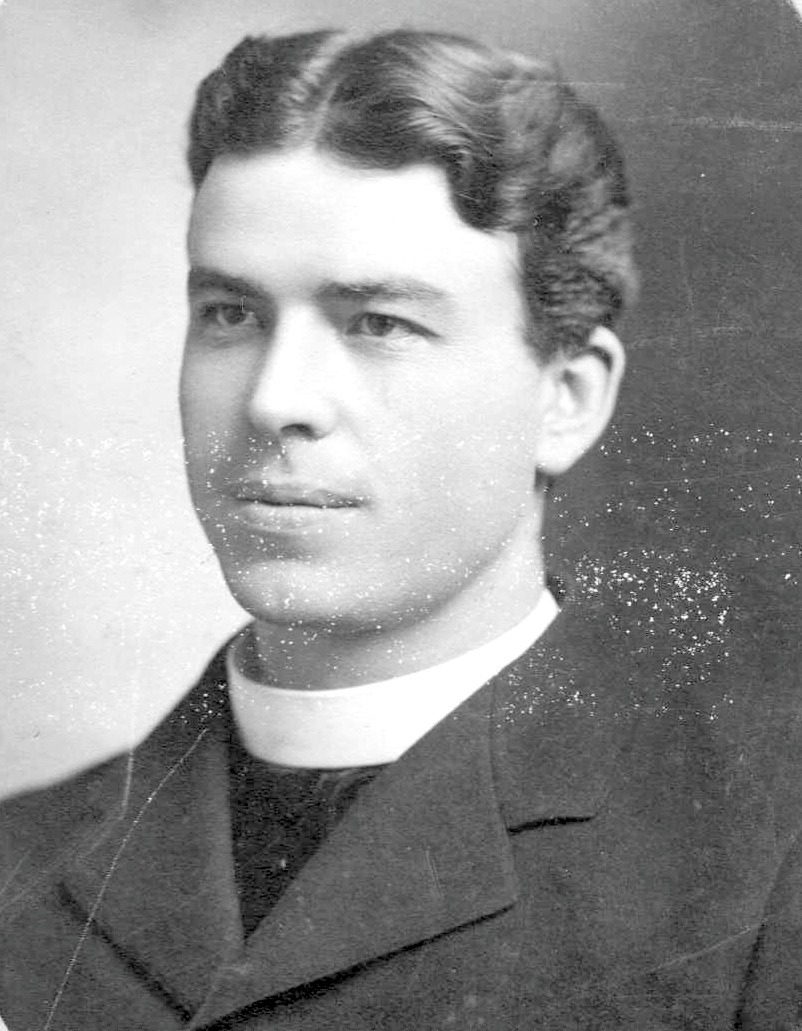
Fr. Cieminski's ordination picture, 1895. Courtesy, Polish Museum, Winona MN

Young Jozef studied in Winona schools until he went away to seminary. He was then ordained in Saint Paul, in 1895. Father Cieminski's first assignment was as secretary to Reverend John Ireland, first Archbishop of Saint Paul. The strong-minded Archbishop Ireland was no admirer of Eastern Europeans, or of Poles in particular. But Father Cieminski's talents were soon needed elsewhere. His first parish assignment transferred him to Saint Stanislaus Kostka in the newly established Diocese of Winona, where he served as assistant to the pastor, Father Jakub W.J. Pacholski. The fact that Archbishop Ireland dispatched his secretary out of the diocese to work alongside the extremely capable Father Pacholski suggests that the disturbances at Saint Stanislaus were more substantial than the available information would indicate.

=== Wilno, Minnesota ===
Father Cieminski's next assignment, in Wilno, Minnesota, returned him to the Archdiocese of Saint Paul. The Polish colony in Wilno had been established in 1883 under the auspices of the Archdiocese and the Chicago and Northwestern Railroad. It represented an attempt to steer underemployed Polish-American urbanites into the Archdiocese of Saint Paul's wide-open western spaces; a recent article by John Radzilowski treats Wilno as an exemplar of Polish-American farm life. Radzilowski also chronicles Archbishop Ireland's ham-fisted attempt to control Wilno's Saint John Cantius Parish by replacing a popular Polish-speaking priest with an unfortunate Bohemian priest who (due solely to his ethnicity) was run out of the parish in some time.

From 1896 to 1902, Father Jan Andrzejewski had labored to build for St. John Cantius what Father Waclaw Kruszka describes as "a new, spacious, and magnificent temple," only to depart just before the building's consecration in a confrontation (according to the 1983 Parish Jubilee Book) over the church organ. Arriving in 1902, Father Cieminski brought the parish back into line despite the fact that Father Andrezejewski remained in Wilno for quite some time. In 1906, Father Cieminski also engaged the School Sisters of Saint Francis from Rochester (otherwise known as the Rochester Franciscans) to staff Saint John Cantius's elementary school. In 1907 Father Cieminski was recalled by the Diocese of Winona as pastor of Saint Casimir's Church in Wells, Minnesota; his three years in the little Faribault County town appear to have been free of any major troubles.

=== Duluth ===
In 1910, Father Cieminski transferred to Duluth, Minnesota, to serve as pastor to the troubled parish of Saints Peter and Paul (now closed). Duluth's second Polish Catholic church had become a battleground between the Diocese of Duluth and a group of "independent" parishioners determined to bring it into the Polish National Catholic Church. Already a group of "independents" had seceded from Duluth's first Polish Catholic church, Saint Mary Star of the Sea, resulting in the 1907 foundation of Saint Josephat's Polish National Church. The legal battle over Saints Peter and Paul had been won, but Father Cieminski had to spend the next five years putting the parish of Saints Peter and Paul back in order.

=== Minneapolis ===
1915 saw Father Cieminski moving to another trouble spot, the parish of Holy Cross in Minneapolis, founded in 1886 by his mentor and friend, Father Pacholski. Holy Cross had been in turmoil for several years, due to a scandal which possibly involved its longtime pastor, Father Henryk Jazdzewski. Sensing an opportunity, a faction of "independents" had already broken away from Holy Cross and founded Sacred Heart Polish National Church. Another such faction had arisen and was trying to take over Holy Cross itself.

Agreeing with him (Monsignor Pacholski) but dissatisfied with the new pastor, the archbishop replaced him with Father Joseph Cieminski of Duluth. Cieminski, who began his career in Winona and ended it there much later, had a reputation as a troubleshooter. Intelligent, shrewd and impressive in body and bearing, he firmly took control in 1915 and remained at Holy Cross until 1932.

— William Galush, "The Polish Experience in Northeast Minnesota," in Gerald J. Langowski (ed.), The Polish Heritage (Winona, 1981), p. 89.

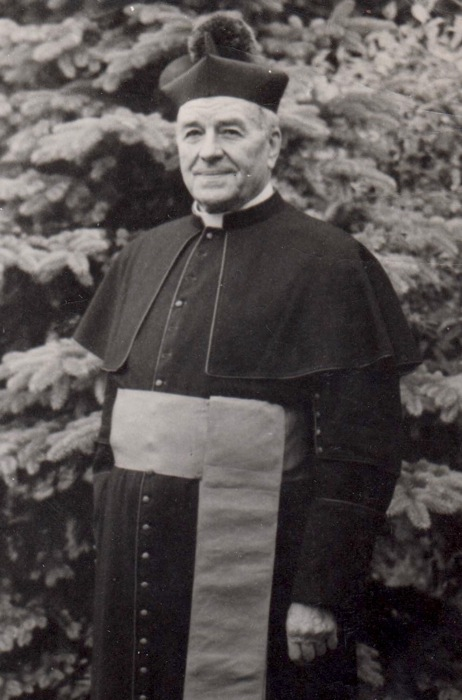
Msgr. Cieminski, circa 1945. Courtesy, Polish Museum, Winona MN

On March 4, 1916, Father Cieminski's task became further complicated when Father Jazdzewski was shot and killed in the rectory of Saint Casimir's Parish in Minneapolis by a former Holy Cross parishioner. Again, Father Cieminski successfully healed a congregation and brought it safely back into the fold.

=== Winona ===
In 1932, Father Cieminski, now aged 65, replaced the late Father Pacholski as pastor of Saint Stanislaus Kostka in Winona. For the first time in his career as a priest, Father Cieminski had the task of building upon an already existing foundation. He went on to become a respected figure in the Winona community,helped by the fact that he was Kashubian born and Winona raised, serving in the "Kashubian Capital of America." In 1943, his efforts were rewarded when Pope Pius XII raised him to the rank of Monsignor. In 1946, he retired after fifty-one years in the priesthood.

Father Joseph F. Cieminski died in a Saint James, Minnesota, retirement facility on November 19, 1959. Over his ninety-two years he had experienced - and taken an integral part in - dramatic changes for both the Roman Catholic Church in Minnesota and the Kashubian community of the Upper Mississippi Valley. He lies buried in Winona, among other members of the Cieminski family, in Saint Mary's Cemetery.
