= St. Stanislaus Parish (Meriden, Connecticut) =

Church in Connecticut, United States

Saint Stanislaus Bishop and Martyr Church Polish: Stanisława Biskupa i Męczennika
- Saint Faustina Parish
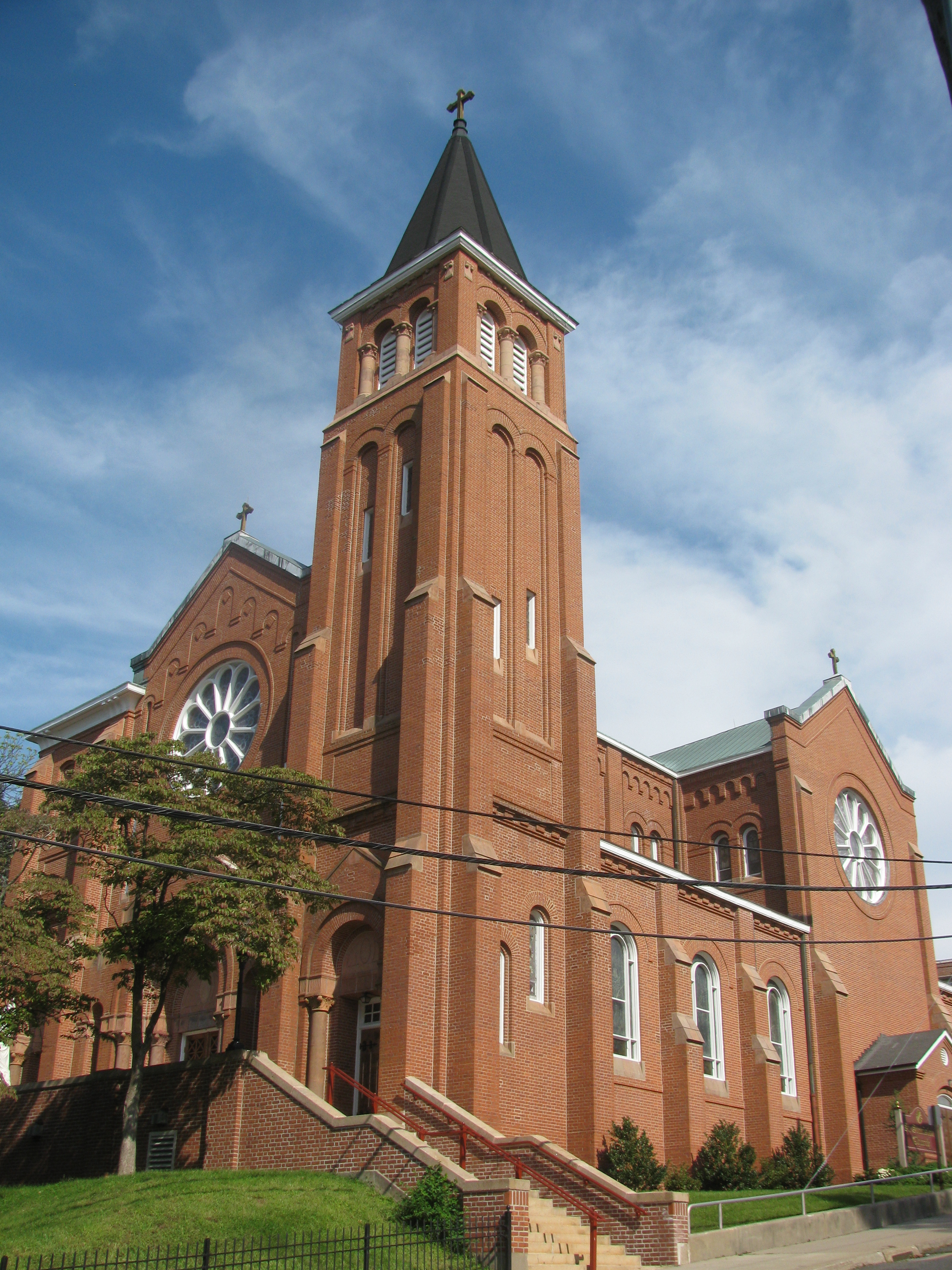
- Saint Stanislaus Bishop and Martyr Church; Polish: Stanisława Biskupa i Męczennika
- Location: Church address: 82 Akron Street; Meriden, CT 06450 School address: 1 Akron Street; Meriden, CT 06450
- Country: United States
- Denomination: Roman Catholic
- Website: Church website: www.stfaustinact.org/ School website: ststansedu.org

History
- Founded: 1891
- Founder: Polish immigrants
- Dedication: St. Stanislaus
- Dedicated: January 8, 1893; 133 years ago

Administration
- Division: Vicariate: New Haven
- Archdiocese: Hartford
- Parish: Saint Faustina Parish

Clergy
- Archbishop: Leonard Paul Blair
- Pastor: Edward Ziemnicki

SS. Peter and Paul Church
- Saint Faustina Parish
- SS. Peter and Paul Church
- 41°27′31″N 72°49′8.8″W
- Location: 139 North Orchard Street; Wallingford, CT
- Country: United States
- Denomination: Roman Catholic

History
- Founded: September 8, 1924
- Founder: Polish immigrants
- Dedication: SS Peter & Paul
- Dedicated: June 22, 1925

Administration
- Parish: Saint Faustina Parish

St. Stanislaus Church (formally Saint Stanislaus Bishop and Martyr Church) in Meriden, Connecticut is a Roman Catholic church originally established in 1891 and dedicated to the Bishop of Kraków, Stanislaus of Szczepanów, an 11th-century Polish Saint. St. Stanislaus's is the third oldest Polish-American Roman Catholic parish in New England and the oldest in the Archdiocese of Hartford. In 2017, Saint Stanislaus parish merged with the nearby Polish-American parish SS. Peter and Paul Parish in Wallingford to form St. Faustina Parish.

The Saint Stanislaus campus of Saint Faustina Parish is made up of the church, school, community center, gymnasium, rectory and garage, convent and chapel, and the cemetery, as well as an outdoor shrine of the Blessed Virgin Mary. Saint Stanislaus parish built the first Polish Roman Catholic church building in Connecticut in 1893, which was replaced by the current church in 1908. The original building also housed the parish school until the construction of the current Saint Stanislaus Parochial School in 1915. The parochial school operated for grades kindergarten through 8th grade until 2015, after which the building was used for a pre-kindergarten program.

Saints Peter and Paul Church was established as an independent parish in 1924 for Polish immigrants setting in Wallingford. The current church building was dedicated a year later in 1925.

The combined parish is named for Faustina Kowalska (1905–1938), a Polish nun canonized in 2000, known for inspiring devotion to Divine Mercy. The parish offices and records are maintained at the Saint Stanislaus campus.

== Saint Stanislaus history ==
The Mother Church of Meriden is St. Rose of Lima, built in 1848, whose congregation was predominantly Irish. From this parish developed the French parish of St. Laurents in 1880. In 1888, the German members of St. Laurents formed the parish of St. Mary. In 1894, the Italian parish of Our Lady of Mount Carmel also developed from St. Laurents.

Early Polish immigrants were drawn to Meriden by the possibility of jobs in the silver manufacturing industry. People such as Franciszek Szumny and Michał Kloc, who like in the old country, went to Mass every Sunday, attended Saint Rose of Lima, but did not understand the language nor the hymns.

=== Original church ===
St. Stanislaus Parish in Meriden, Connecticut, was the first Polish parish founded in the Archdiocese of Hartford. On January 1, 1889, John Damach and friends established a Society of St. Stanislaus, Bishop and Martyr, so named because they wanted from the beginning to have the help of a good Polish saint. Services then began to be held in the basement of St. Rose which was set apart for their use. By the following year, the Society had raised sufficient funds to purchase a small piece of land from Składzień for 700 dollars in 1892. The lot on Jefferson Street was 100×170 feet and on top of a hill, and so a bit uncomfortable for the older parishioners, but the land was cheaper than elsewhere, and after all, it was higher and closer to Heaven.

With land at Jefferson and Oak Streets acquired, in 1891, Bishop Lawrence Stephen McMahon appointed Antoni Klawiter as the first pastor. Klawiter had been a Polish insurgent in the January Uprising of 1863 against the Russian Empire. The cornerstone for the church was laid by P. F. McAlenny, pastor of St. Rose's Church, on October 30, 1892. The first Polish church in Meriden, and in the state of Connecticut, was very modest, measuring 40 feet wide by 90 feet long. The original St. Stanislaus Church was built with a small school wing and a few small rooms for the pastor's residence; the construction cost was $5,000. Bishop McMahon dedicated the first St. Stanislaus Church, a small wooden edifice, on January 8, 1893.

Before long the need for a new, larger church became apparent. With a $9,000 treasury, John L. Ceppa bought land for a new church site at the corner of Pleasant St. and Olive St. The Society of St. Stanislaus Bishop and Martyr immediately began collecting the funds to build a new, temporary church on the site. There was much discussion among the parishioners as to what form the church should take: whether the church would be wooden or brick, towering or low and humble, how to make the altar and organ, would there be a hall, would there be a school, would the tower be tall and cubic or circular like in the old country, gothic architecture or romanesque.

=== Present church ===
The architects of the present Saint Stanislaus Church were Reiley and Steinback of New York and Stamford, Connecticut. The new church was dedicated by Bishop Michael Tierney of Hartford on September 7, 1908.

In observance of the current church buildings's centennial in 2008, Pastor Edward Ziemnicki began a fundraising campaign known as Century of Faith to renovate and repair the church. The project was overseen by Kronenberger & Sons Restoration, Inc. of Middletown, Connecticut. Founder of the firm, Thomas J. Kronenberger, was a life-long parishioner of St. Stanislaus. The work had two components: restoration of the interior, and of the outside walkway and staircase. The interior restoration involved repairing plaster, painting, the repair of stained glass windows, the restoration of the column capitals, and parts of the artwork and murals.

In 2009 the church again underwent extensive renovations, including additional marble to restore its historic character.

The parish holds an annual Polish Festival on the church grounds. The parish celebrated its 125th anniversary in 2016.

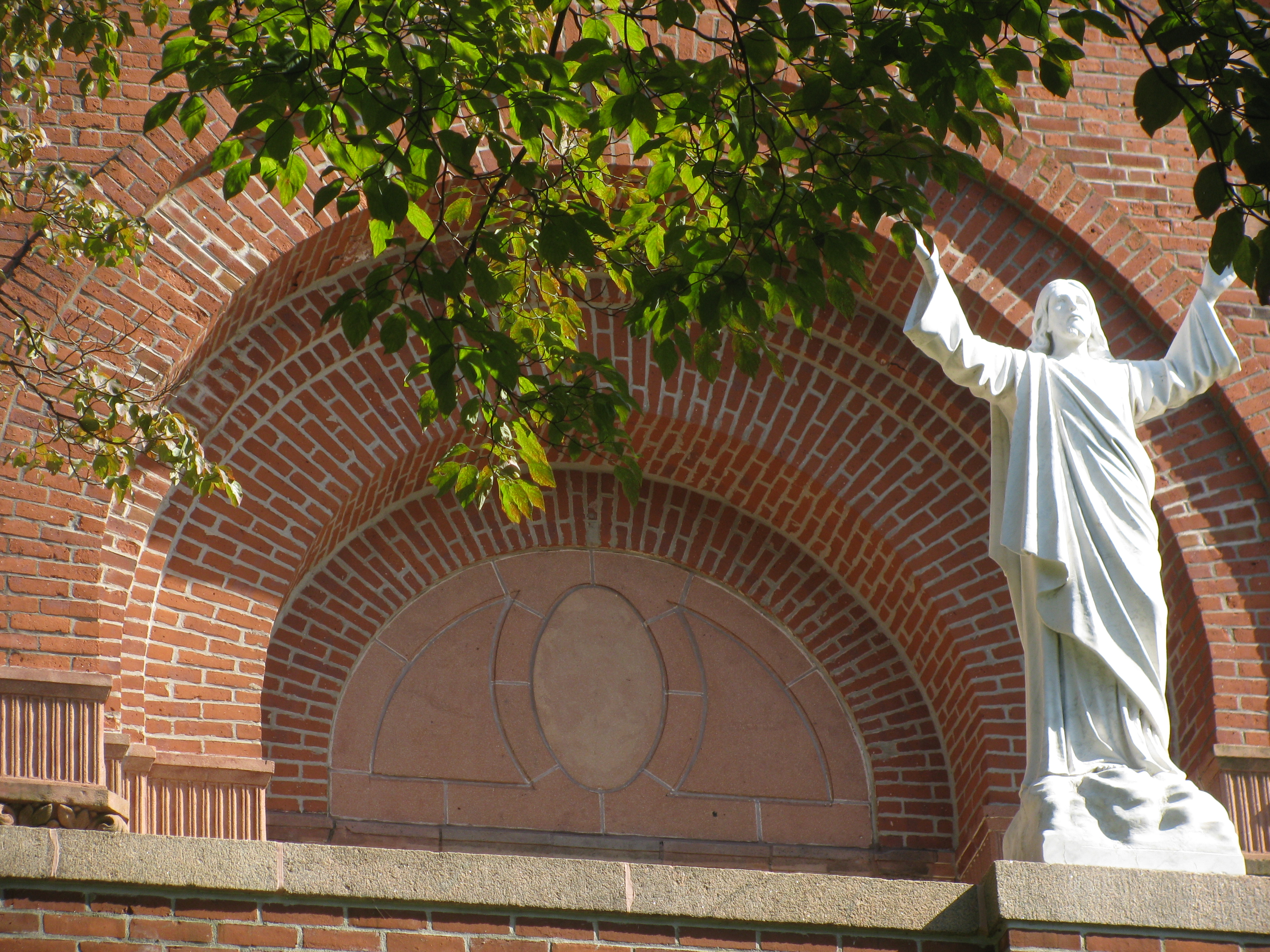
Front entrance of St. Stanislaus Church

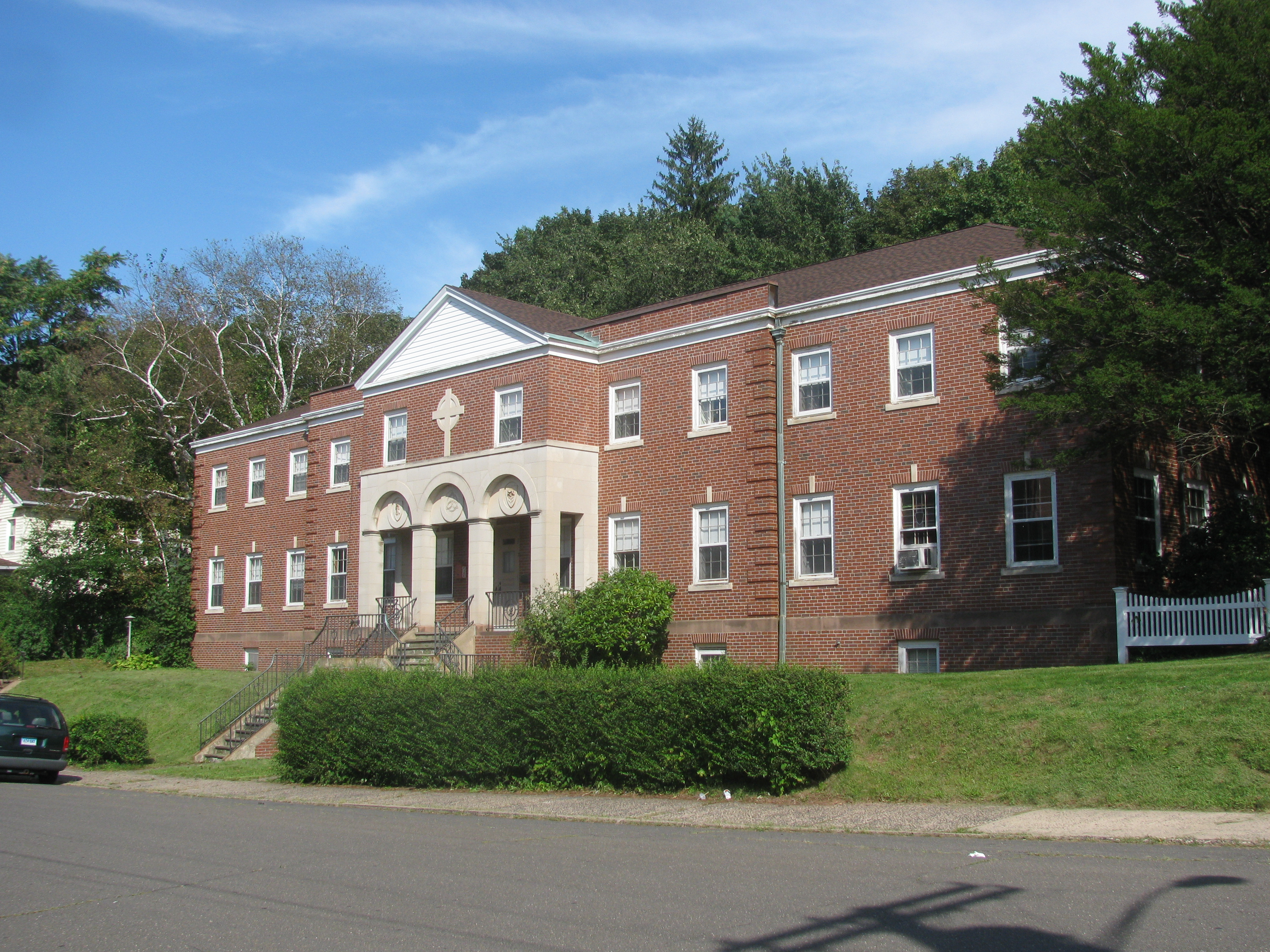
St. Stanislaus Convent

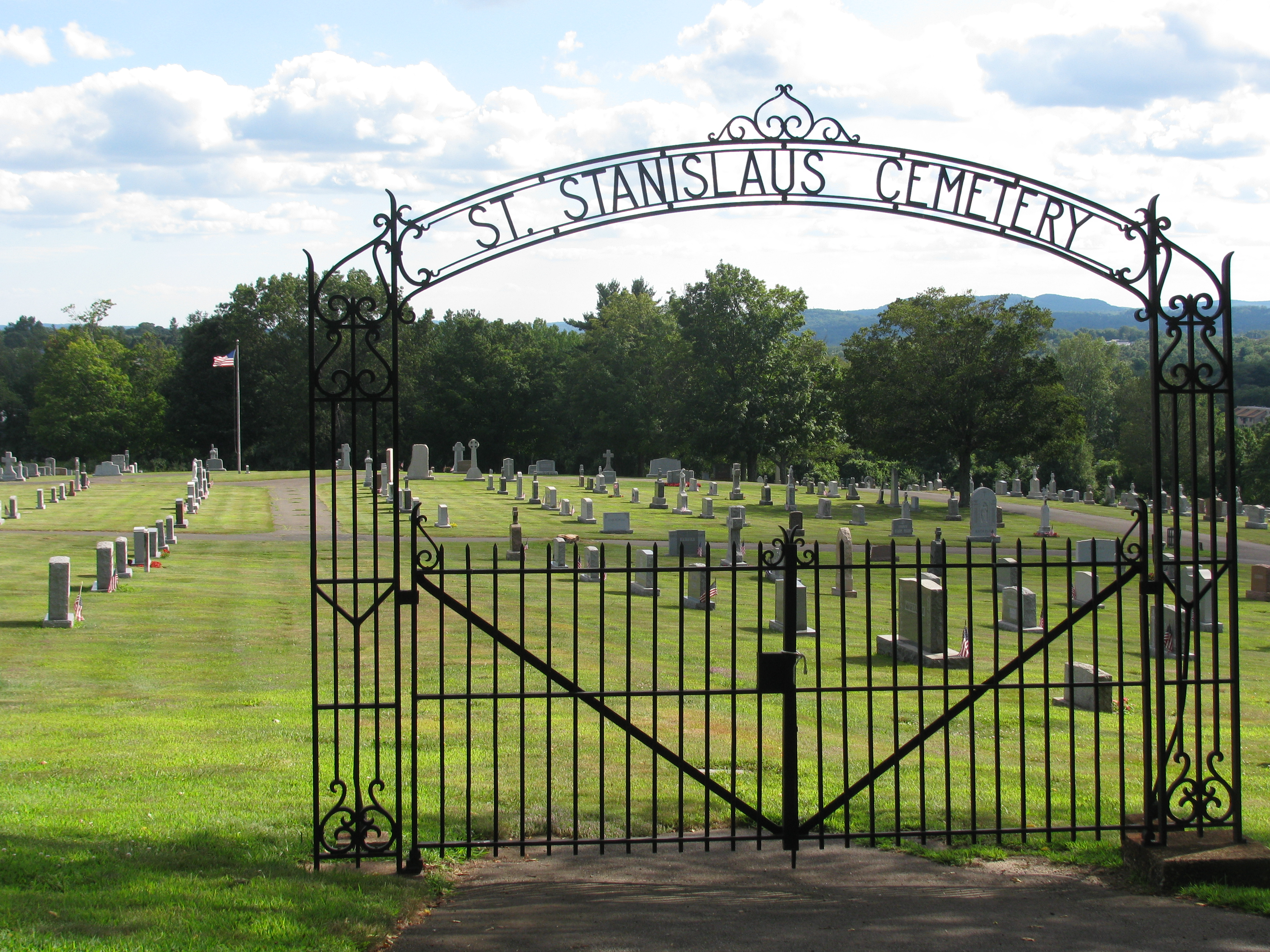
The gate to Saint Stanislaus Cemetery

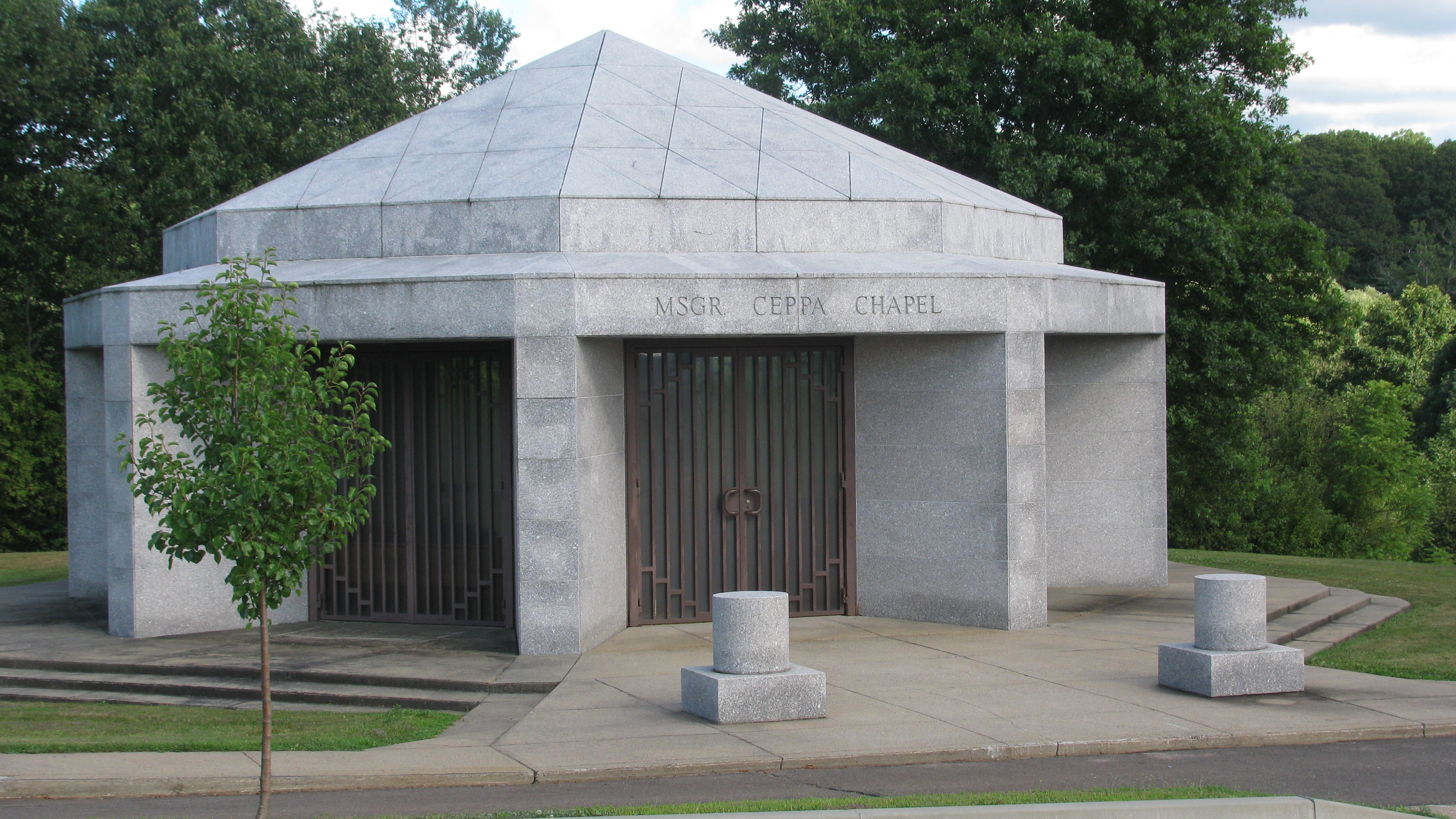
Msgr.Jan Ceppa Chapel at St. Stanislaus Cemetery

== SS. Peter and Paul history ==
On September 8, 1924, Father Stanislaus Iciek was designated as temporary administrator of the newly created Saints Peter and Paul Parish, designated for Polish immigrants settling in Wallingford, CT. Under his direction, the immigrants bought land on North Orchard St. and set about the task of building a church. SS. Peter and Paul Church was opened for the first Mass on May 25, 1925. On June 22, 1925, the finished mission-style church was solemnly dedicated by Thomas S. Duggan acting on behalf of Bishop John Joseph Nilan. The architect was Henry F. Ludorf of Hartford Ct.

== Merger ==
Effective June 29, 2017, St. Stanislaus Church merged with Ss. Peter & Paul in Wallingford to form St. Faustina Parish. Ss. Peter & Paul was founded in 1924 to serve the Polish community of Wallingford. Parish records are held with the new parish of St. Faustina, with two church buildings. Parish administration is handled from the St. Stanislaus premises.

In July 2018, St. Faustina's sponsored a trip to Washington D.C.

== Saint Stanislaus Parochial School ==
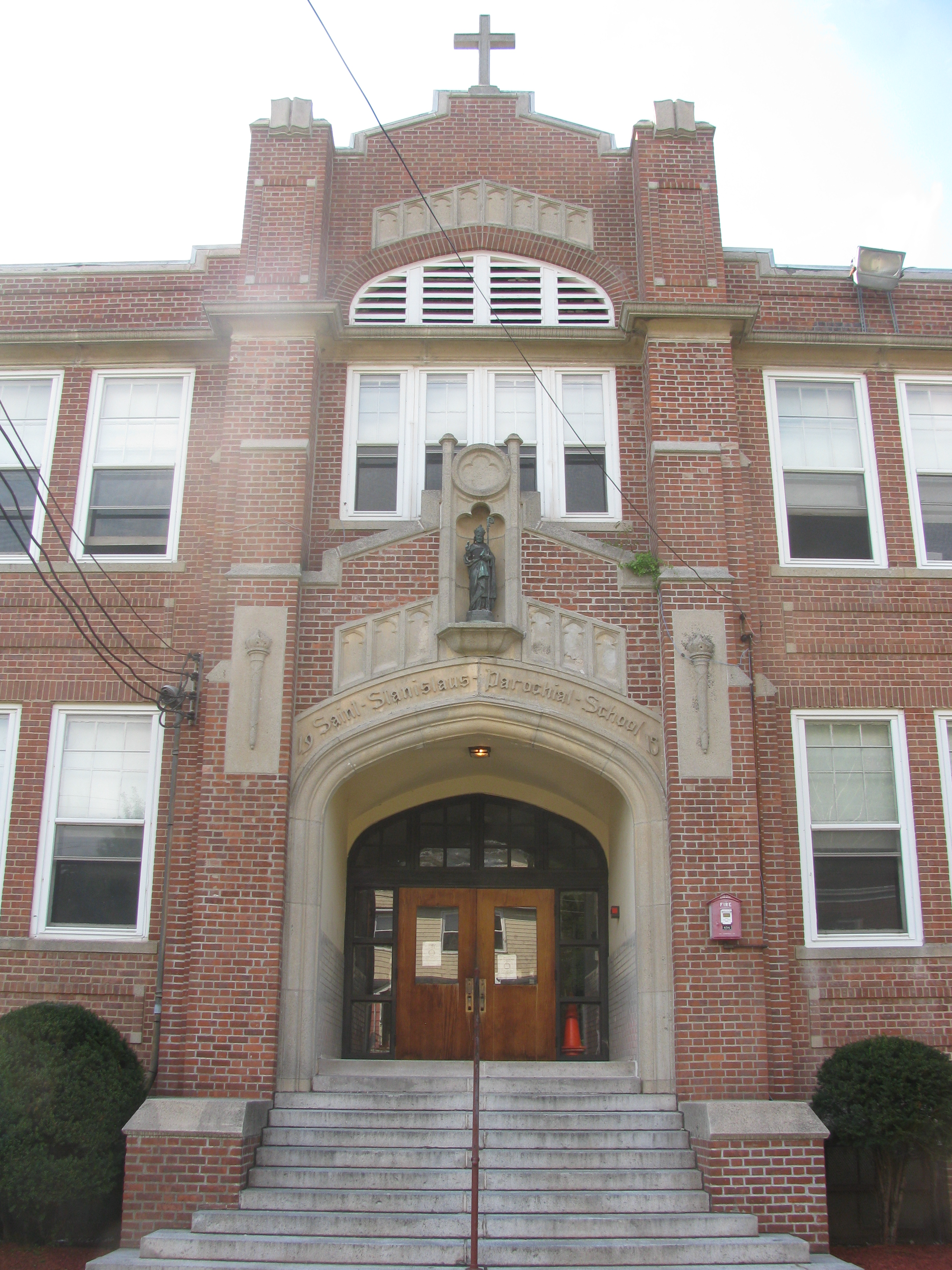
The main entrance to St. Stanislaus School

The school was originally housed in the classroom wing of the earlier church on Jefferson Street, and served area youth from 1892 to 1915, when the modern school building opened. St. Stanislaus's Parochial School enrolled students from Kindergarten through 8th grade. Starting in 1990, the Sisters of St. Joseph taught a pre-school program in the Convent, which existed for well-over a decade. Saint Stanislaus school closed in 2015.

=== St. Stanislaus School Readiness Program ===
With the closing of St. Stanislaus Pre-School in the mid-2000s, the need for a pre-K program was evident and St. Stanislaus' facilities became a center for the City of Meriden's School Readiness Program. The city's aim is to provide care for three- and four-year-old Meriden residents based on a sliding fee scale. The School Readiness Program at St. Stanislaus helps to prepare young students for Kindergarten. The program is run by archdiocese Catholic Charities through a franchise with the City of Meriden.

== Parish organizations ==
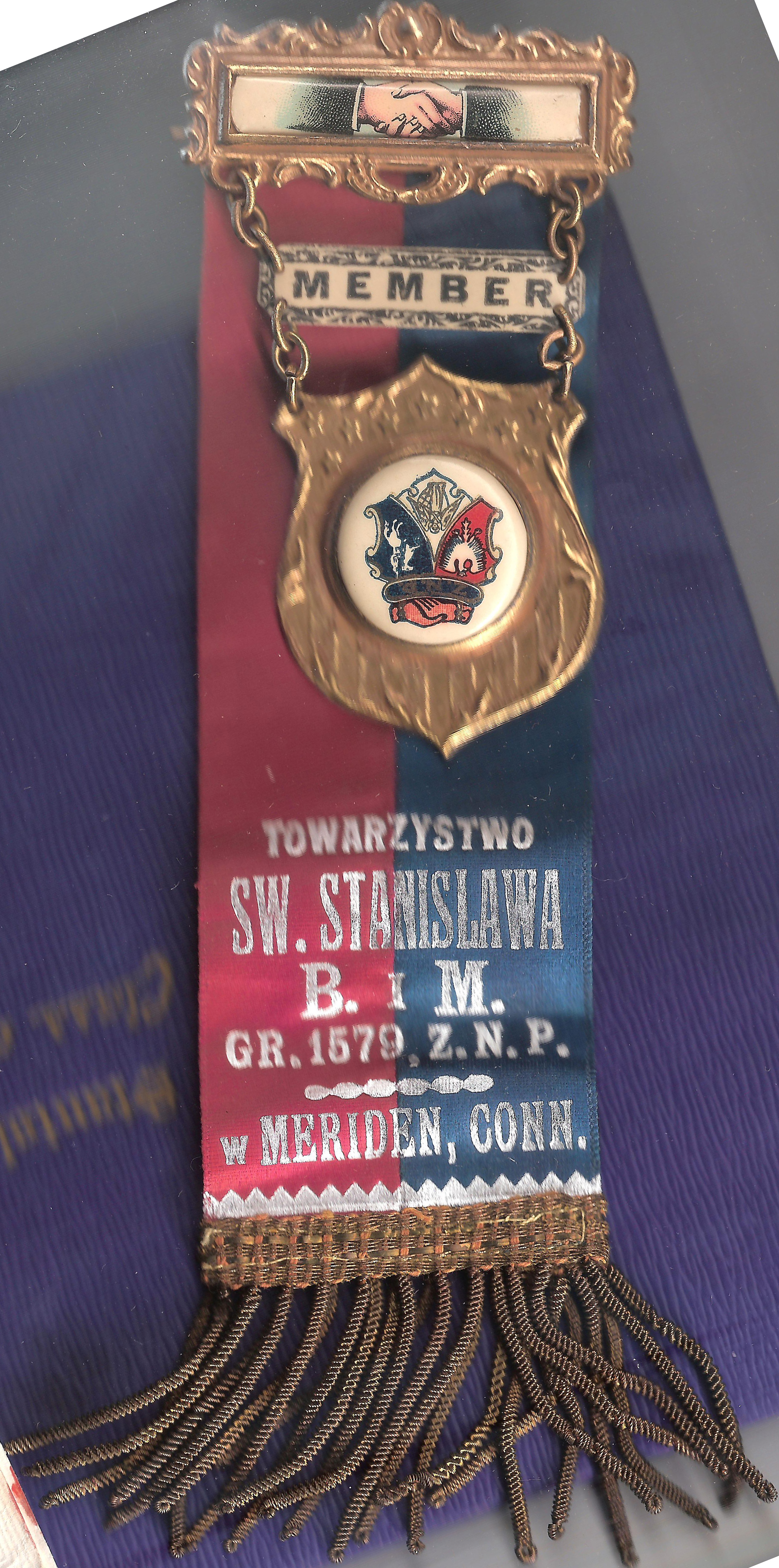
Badge of the Society of St. Stanislaus Bishop and Martyr

- The Society of Saint Stanislaus Bishop and Martyr -was instrumental in founding the parish; it later disbanded.
- The Ladies' Rosary Society
- The Holy Name Society
- St. Theresa Society
- The Sunshine Club -Seniors' group that meets during the week in the school's cafeteria
- The Ladies Guild
- Knights of Columbus

=== Pierogi making ===
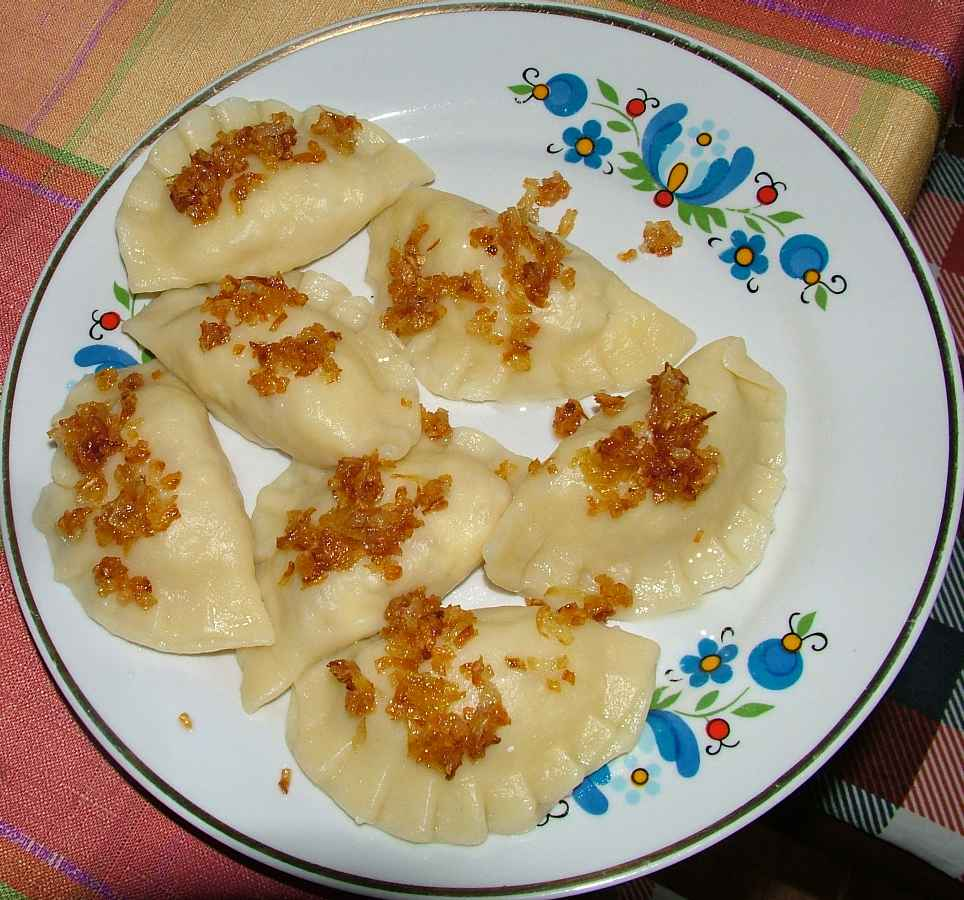
Polish Pierogi ruskie, or potato and cheese pierogi.

As an ongoing, year-round fundraiser for the Parish, with proceeds going towards the school or church, Tom Wronski, a dedicated Parishioner, has for many years organized pierogi making. A group of dough-makers get there early on a Saturday morning to prepare the dough; which is then given to the rollers, who roll the dough thin and cut it into circles; which then are given on trays to the stuffers, who fill the pierogi with Farmer's cheese, potato-and-cheese, or sauerkraut filling; which was made the day earlier by the filling-makers; next involved are the boilers, who parboil the raw pierogi; which is then laid out on tables to dry and begin to cool, are then put in the freezers to chill, and finally are put in bags of a dozen based on the filling by the baggers. All of the work is done by volunteers of all ages and backgrounds, who enjoy making pierogi, helping the Parish, and spending time on a Saturday morning with fellow parishioners.

The pierogi are made on many Saturdays throughout the year in preparation for holidays, Parish gatherings, and the Polish Festival, formerly the June Festival, where they are quickly sold-out.

== Ceppa Field ==
Ceppa Field, named for early St. Stanislaus pastor John L. Ceppa, is located on Gale Avenue, in Meriden, not far from the church; it is currently used by Platt and Maloney high schools.

== Gwara Merydeńska ==
The Meriden diaspora is Connecticut's oldest Polonia, having been started well over 120 years ago. With the modern Polish language largely the result of the turbulence of World War II, there is a recognizable difference between the Polish spoken in Meriden by older immigrants together with their children, and today's Polish speakers in the Ojczyzna, or Fatherland. Some of the earliest Poles to Meriden came in the 1870s, and all of the Polish immigrants which started Saint Stanislaus Parish emigrated during the age of the partition of Poland, meaning many of Meriden's Poles left from the Austro-Hungarian, German, or Russian empires; and not from Poland. And in the early Parish, perhaps the majority of those immigrants came from the Kingdom of Galicia.

Many of these early immigrants left before World War I from Galicia during the Great Economic Emigration, beginning in the 1880s with the mass emigration of Galician peasantry and temporarially ending with the outbreak of the Great World War. The war separated many families on opposite sides of the Atlantic, so to this day many St. Stanislaus Parishioners maintain Christmas and Easter card contact with distant cousins and families in the old country.

Many of Saint Stanislaus' Polish parishioners returned to fight for Poland's cause in the Blue Army, or Haller's Army, which was formed in France by Poles from diasporas from all over the United States, Canada, and Brazil, as well as by former prisoners of war from the imperial armies of Germany and Russia; they were organized under Gen. Józef Haller.

After the First World War, 1914–1918, many more Poles left the Second Polish Republic for a new start in America. With a thriving economy and industry in Meriden, many of these Poles made their way to Meriden and into the Parish.

The immigration of Poles slowed tremendously after World War II, but continues to this day with new Polish parishioners often finding their way to St. Stanislaus in Meriden.

As a Parish with a long history in Polonia, the language spoken in Meriden is a lively one, but not particularly correct. Meriden's Polish is the result of the mixing of the dialects and gwaras spoken before World War II, of the entrance of new words from a developing culture, and from the simple passage of time as language changes or is forgotten. A number of minor features of Polish vocabulary spoken in the first half of the 20th century have been retained in gwara merydeńska, which now sound archaic to modern Poles.

Additionally, gwara merydeńska is largely half-na-pół, that is, a part Polish and a part English. An example of this form of Polish may be:

"A policeman gave me a ticket on the highway."

Which in modern Polish would appear as:

"Policjant dał mi mandat na autostradzie."

However, in a Polish typical of older Polonias in the United States, this may appear as:

"Kap dał mi tiketa na hajłeju."

Gwara merydeńska (plural) Nominative case	Genitive case	Modern Polish Nominative case	Genitive case	English
Merydeniak / Meredeniak (Merydeniacy / Meredeniacy)	Merydeniaka / Meredeniaka (Merydeniaków / Meredeniaków)	n/a	n/a	Person/People from Meriden, Connecticut.
Parafianin merideński (Parafianie merideńscy)	Parafianina merideńskiego (Parafinianów merideńskich)	Parafianin z Meriden (Parafianie z Meriden)	Parafianina z Meriden (Parafianów z Meriden)	Meriden parishioner(s)
Polak merideński (Polacy merideńscy)	Polaka merideńskiego (Polaków merideńskich)	Polak z Meriden (Polacy z Meriden)	Polaka z Meriden (Polaków z Meriden)	Meriden Pole(s) / Poles from Meriden
Pycier (Pyciery)	Pyciera (Pycierów)	Miotacz (Miotacze)	Miotacza (Miotaczy)	Baseball pitcher
Ketcher (Ketchery)	Ketchera (Ketcherów)	Łapacz (Łapacze)	Łapacza (Łapaczy)	Baseball catcher
Meriden / Mereden / Meryden - w Meridenie	Meriden / Merydenu	Meriden - w Meriden	n/a	Meriden - in Meriden
Diecezja hartfordzka / Biskup hartfordzki (Biskupi hartfordzcy)	Diecezji hartfordzkiej / Biskupa hartfordzkiego (Biskupów hartfordzkich)	Diecezja Hartford / Diecezja Hartfordu / Biskup Hartford / Biskup Hartfordu	Diecezji Hartford / Diecezji Hartfordu / Biskupa Hartford / Biskupa Hartfordu	The Diocese of Hartford / Bishop of Hartford
Babci [pronounced: Baci - bah-CHEE]	n/a Generally used with English	Babcia (Babcie)	Babci (Babć)	Grandma(s)
Cioci [pronounced: chugh-CHEE]	n/a Generally used with English	Ciocia (Ciocie)	Cioci (Cioć)	Auntie / Aunt(s)
Dziadziu	Dziadzia	Dziadek [dialekt małopolski: Dziadziu] (Dziadki / Dziadkowie)	Dziadka [dialekt małopolski: Dziadzia] (Dziadków)	Grandpa(s)

== Bibliography ==
- Blejwas, Stanislaus A. (1991). St. Stanislaus B. & M. Parish, Meriden, Connecticut. Central Connecticut State University Polish Studies Program monographs. ISBN 0-910179-01-8.
- The 150th Anniversary of Polish-American Pastoral Ministry. Webster, Massachusetts: St. Joseph Basilica. September 11, 2005.
- The Official Catholic Directory in USA
