= Jan Romuald Byzewski =

Kashubian priest

Jan Romuald Byzewski OFM
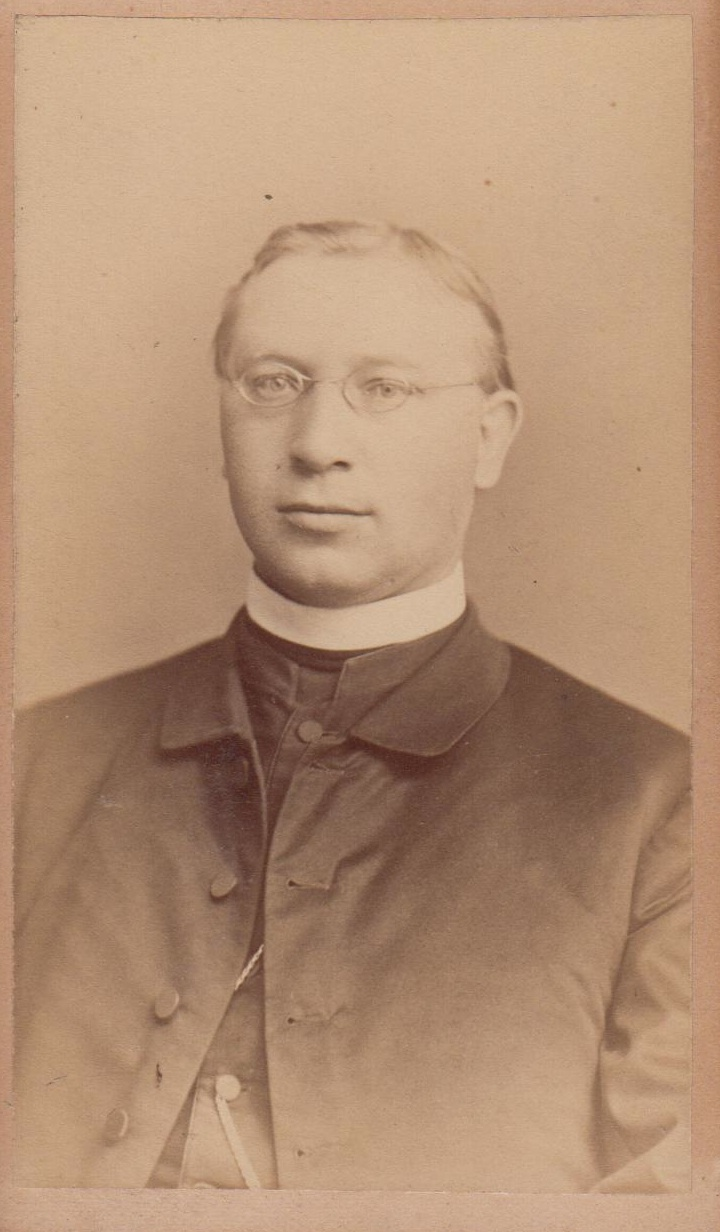

Personal life
- Born: Jan Byzewski; 10 October 1842 Karwen, Province of Prussia, Kingdom of Prussia
- Died: 30 October 1905 (aged 63) Green Bay, Brown County, Wisconsin, US
- Resting place: Pittsville
- Occupation: Priest

Religious life
- Religion: Christianity
- Denomination: Catholicism
- Order: Franciscans
- Founder of: Wiarus
- Ordination: 5 August 1866

Jan Romuald Byzewski (10 October 1842 – 30 October 1905), better known in the United States as Father Romuald Byzewski, was a Catholic priest and founder of the Wiarus newspaper.

== Biography ==
Byzewski was born in the Kashubian village of, what was then named, Karwen, in the Prussian jurisdiction of Danzig. After graduating from secondary school in Neustadt in Westpreußen he entered the Franciscan Recollect Province as a novice on February 7, 1861. Since this was the feast of Saint Romuald, he added the name Romuald to his own. He was ordained to the Roman Catholic priesthood at Liège, Belgium, on August 5, 1866. After his ordination, Reverend Byzewski became professor of philosophy and theology at the Franciscan seminary in Königlich Lonk, Province of Prussia. In 1875, at the height of the Kulturkampf, the Congregations Law was enacted, effectively forbidding Roman Catholic religious orders to operate within the Prussian Empire. Byzewski was consequently permitted to leave the Franciscans and emigrate to the United States, thereby becoming part of the Kashubian diaspora.

Byzewski arrived in New York on August 13, 1875, aboard the SS Mosel. His first service in America was as pastor of Saint Stanislaus Kostka Parish in Winona, Minnesota. He served in this role until 1890, helped no doubt by his Kashubian heritage in a city which came to be known as the "Kashubian Capital of America." He established a school for the parish, brought in the School Sisters of Notre Dame to teach there, and served as a capable intermediary between the English-speaking majority and the bumptious Kashubians. As a stalwart supporter of the Polish Roman Catholic Union of America he also established the newspaper Wiarus, which quickly became the United States's leading Polish-language periodical, under the editorship of the mercurial Kashubian poet Hieronim Derdowski. According to the historian-priest Waclaw Kruszka, unexplained “disagreements and difficulties” may have sped Byzewski's departure from Winona.

An 1890 city directory for Milwaukee lists Byzewski as an assistant pastor at Saint Stanislaus Church at 404 Mitchell Street. Yet by June 1890, he was in Detroit, Michigan directing the foundation of that city's fifth Polish parish, Saint Francis of Assisi. In 1898 he was transferred to Sweetest Heart of Mary Roman Catholic Church, also in Detroit. In 1899, Reverend Byzewski was granted readmission to the Franciscan Order, and relocated to Pulaski. There he was a pastor for parishes and served as the first rector of Saint Bonaventure College.

Byzewski died in Green Bay on October 30, 1905. His grave is at Franciscan Fathers Cemetery in Pittsville.
