= Paul Breza =

American priest and activist (1937–2025)

Paul Joseph Breza (June 23, 1937 – April 7, 2025) was an American Roman Catholic priest and Kashubian activist.

== Early life ==
Breza was born in Winona, Minnesota on June 23, 1937, the son of Joseph Peter and Alice Seraphine (Pehler) Breza, both of whom were descendants of Kashubian immigrants from Bytów, Poland. He was educated at Saint Stanislaus Kostka School, Cotter High School and Saint Mary's University of Minnesota.

== Priestly ministry ==
After completing his seminary studies, Breza was ordained a priest on June 1, 1963, for the Diocese of Winona. During his nearly fifty years of active priestly ministry, he served the Diocese of Winona in a number of roles: pastor, chaplain, teacher, and administrator, tending to people from across the spectrum of society. In his retirement, he continued to fill in for other priests whenever needed in addition to serving as the Diocesan archivist.

== Kashubian American activism ==
In 1979, Breza established the Polish Cultural Institute and Museum in Winona in a former lumber yard office he had purchased two years earlier. Initially intended to commemorate Winona's Polish American heritage, the Cultural Institute and Museum has also developed a Kashubian element after Breza's visits to Bytów in the late 1980s and the 1990s. Under Breza's guidance, Winona and Bytów became Sister Cities in 2004, and Bytów celebrated its first annual Dzien Winony ("Winona Day") on September 26, 2006. Under the Polish Cultural Institute's auspices, students from both Winona and Bytów participate in an exchange program, the most recent of which took place in 2012. Breza was also instrumental in highlighting Winona's longtime status, dating back to 1898, as "Kashubian Capital of America."

== Honors and awards ==
Breza received public honors for his priestly ministry and for his service to the Kashubian American community, both in Poland and in the United States. In 2007 his alma mater, Cotter High School, named him its third "Alumnus of the Year." In 2008 the city of Bytów recognized him with the title "Honorary Citizen of Bytów." In 2010, Breza was inducted into Winona's Polish Heritage Hall of Fame. On May 5, 2013, in a ceremony at the Polish Museum, the Polish Consul General in Chicago, Ms. Paulina Kapuscinska, presented Breza with the Cavalier's Cross of the Order of Merit of the Republic of Poland for his contribution to Polish-American relations. On June 1, 2013, with representatives from the town on Bytów in attendance, Breza celebrated the fiftieth anniversary of his ordination to the Roman Catholic priesthood with a special Mass at the Basilica of Saint Stanislaus Kostka and a banquet at the Polish Museum.

== Death ==
Breza died on April 7, 2025, at the age of 87.
