= Hieronim Derdowski =

American poet

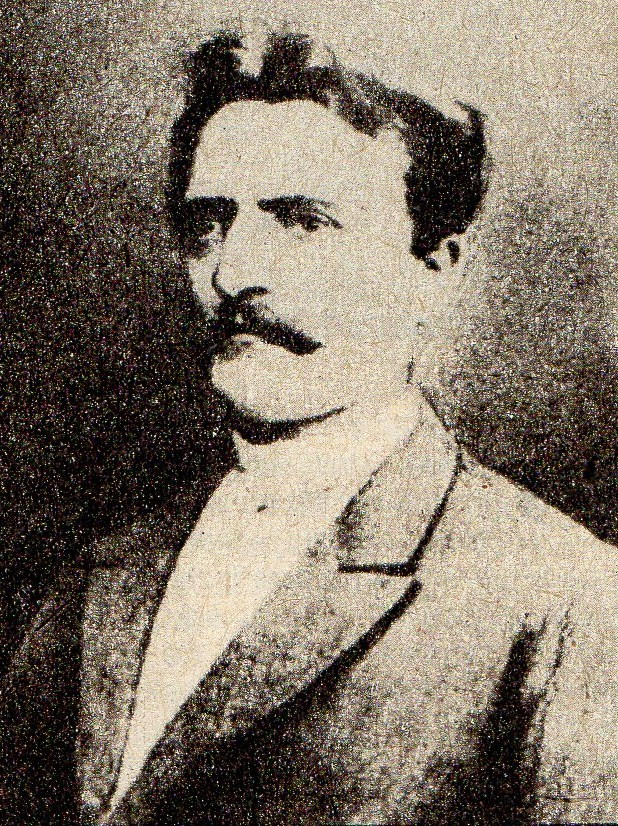
- Born: March 9, 1852; Wiele, German Empire
- Died: August 13, 1902 (aged 50); Winona, Minnesota, America

Hieronim Derdowski (Kashubian Hieronim Derdowsczi or Jarosz Derdowsczi; March 9, 1852 – August 13, 1902) was a Kashubian intellectual and activist. He was born to Kashubian parents in the Pomeranian village of Wiele in the German Empire. By the time Derdowski emigrated to the United States in 1885, he had already studied for the Roman Catholic priesthood, been repeatedly incarcerated by the German authorities, and edited a newspaper in the city of Thorn. At the time, however, Derdowski was better known as a poet. Within two years of reaching the United States he became editor of the Winona, Minnesota Polish-language newspaper Wiarus. In this role he gained a reputation as a strong voice for the Polish-American community, also known as Polonia.

== Life in Poland ==
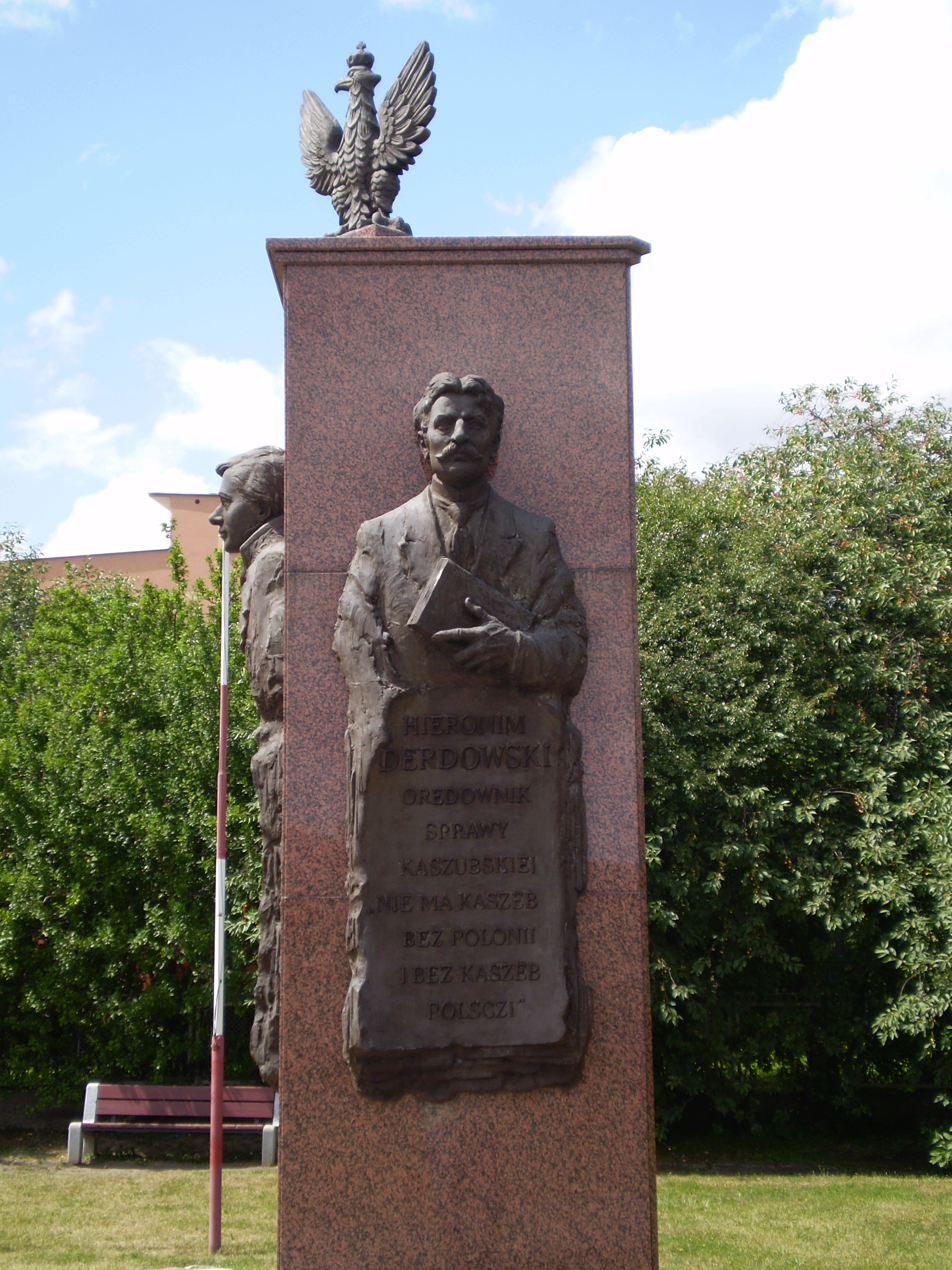
Monument to Hieronim Derdowski in Rumia, Poland

Derdowski was born on March 9, 1852 in Wiele, German Empire. Given Derdowski's flair for storytelling, his own accounts of his youthful adventures should likely be taken with caution. He may or may not have run away to join the French Foreign Legion at age fifteen, or studied for the priesthood in Rome. But it is clear from Polish sources that young Hieronym was intended to become a priest and that he received in Chojnice and then Braniewo an appropriately rigorous education, which included both Polish and German. To judge from Derdowski's literary accomplishments he was an excellent, if not necessarily well-behaved student: the brilliant but incorrigibly roguish young student "Derda" who causes so much trouble in Book Three of Majkowski's epic The Life and Adventures of Remus is beyond doubt a representation of Derdowski, upon whom Majkowski also wrote a 1911 monograph.

Leaving home by 1870 and in the following six years Derdowski worked mostly at teaching jobs while continuing to write poetry. After an abortive trip to France in 1877–1878 he returned to Toruń, where he edited the newspaper Gazeta Toruńska from 1879 to 1882. His life after that was marked by wandering, poverty, and imprisonment in German jails until 1885, when personal and economic reasons convinced him to start a new life in the United States. Although he was obviously not beloved of the Prussian authorities, neither was he in danger of long-term incarceration.

Despite his straitened living circumstances, Derdowski produced his finest work while living in Poland. Highly learned and equally fluent in the Kashubian "vernacular" and the Polish "high tongue," he contributed greatly to both the Kashubian and the Polish traditions. His 1880 satirical epic, O Panu Czorlińścim co do Pucka po sece jachoł (Mr. Czorlinsczi Goes To Puck To Buy Fishing Nets) is regarded as the beginning of Kashubian poetry. Other Kashubian-language works written before his emigration are Kaszubi pod Widnem ("The Kashubians by Widno," 1883) and Jasiek na Knieji ("Johnny from the Forest," 1884).

== Life in Winona ==
Upon reaching the United States, Derdowski worked first for the Chicago socialist newspaper Gazeta Narodowa and then for the Pielgrzym Polski of Detroit. At the invitation of Father Jan Romuald Byzewski, pastor of the Parish of Saint Stanislaus Kostka and (like Derdowski) a participant in the Kashubian diaspora, he came to Winona, Minnesota to edit Wiarus. Derdowski's arrival made Winona a major center of Polish-American intellectual life. Though Wiarus may have changed its affiliation back and forth between the Polish Roman Catholic Union of America and the Polish National Alliance, the force of his impassioned rhetoric never faltered. And even when Derdowski's voice was not appreciated, it was always heard: in Minnesota, in Chicago, on the East Coast, and even in the Old Country itself. Although Wiarus was written in so-called "pure" Polish, Derdowski's literary achievements and presence in Winona contributed to its being known as the "Kashubian Capital of America."

Derdowski also involved himself in the affairs of Saint Stanislaus Kostka Parish. After Father Byzewski left in 1890, a series of pastors and assistant pastors served Saint Stanislaus, some of whom met with Derdowski's approval and some not. Tensions often rose, especially during the parish's rapid growth in the early 1890s and Derdowski was in the thick of things, more often than not fanning the flames. With the 1894 arrival of Father Jakub W.J. Pacholski as pastor, Saint Stanislaus returned to an even keel and Derdowski played a more settled role in the life of Winona's Kashubian community. Sadly, Derdowski never fully recovered from an 1896 stroke, and the strain of providing for his wife, Joanna, and their two daughters also took its toll on his health. His death in 1902 was scarcely even noticed by the local Winona press. Joanna Derdowska continued operating Wiarus until 1915, when it was sold outside of the family, finally shutting down in 1919.

== Legacy ==
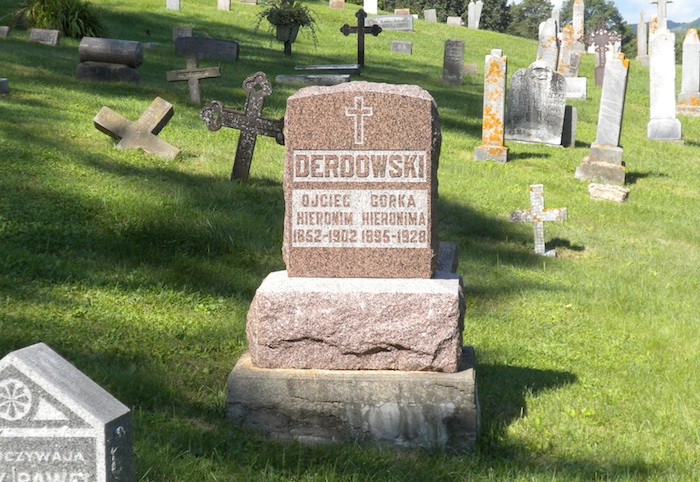
Grave of Hieronim Derdowski, Saint Mary's Cemetery, Winona, MN

Hieronim Derdowski combined, both in his life and in his writing, his devotion to both of his heritages: Kashubian and Polish. On the death of the founder of Kaszubian literature, Dr. Florian Ceynowa, he famously stated Nie ma Kaszëb bez Polonii, a bez Kaszëb Polśczi "No Kaszubia without Polonia, no Poland without Kaszubia." This attitude he applied equally to both periods of his life: the Polish years and the American years. He supported the retention of old Kashubian ways, but considered that his native culture was viable only under the larger and more pervasive Polish culture; an educated Kashubian had also to be an educated Pole:

Hieronim Jarosz Derdowski – according to whom Kashubian was 'a dialect of Polish' or 'a weak shade of the Mazovian dialect' – saw Kashubian solely as the language of belles-lettres, alongside the official Polish language. He felt that knowledge of Polish among the Kashubs should be deepened, as it could act as their weapon of defence against Germanisation.

Derdowski further insisted that Kashubian Americans were obliged to learn and observe both Polish and Kashubian traditions while becoming solid citizens of their new country. Over the years, Derdowski's efforts have been honored and celebrated within his native land. His works were influential upon Dr. Aleksander Majkowski and the Society of Young Kashubians; they continue to receive considerable attention from Kashubian and Polish scholars today. A statue of him was erected in his native Wiele. Aside from activities sponsored by Winona's Polish Cultural Institute and Museum, Derdowski is sadly far less remembered in the United States, where a simple headstone marks his grave in a beautiful, out of the way Roman Catholic cemetery in a sleepy river town of 27,000 souls.

== Works ==
His works were part of the anthology Modra struna (1973).
