= Antoni Klawiter =

Polish Catholic priest

The Reverend Antoni Klawiter
- Portrait of Antoni Klawiter
- Church: Catholic Church

Orders
- Ordination: 1859

Personal details
- Born: November 12, 1836 Chojnice, Kingdom of Prussia
- Died: September 30, 1913 (aged 76) Mikado, Saskatchewan
- Denomination: Roman Catholic

Antoni Klawiter (1836–1913) was a Roman Catholic and later independent Polish Catholic priest, was born in Prussian Chojnice (then known in German as Konitz, now in modern Poland), on November 12, 1836. The scholarly consensus is that he was the son of Polonized Germans; by virtue of his Kashubian birthplace and his later experience pastoring Kashubians in Winona, Minnesota, he will not have been unfamiliar with the Kashubian culture. In 1859, he was ordained a Roman Catholic priest in Włocławek, and became four years afterward one of many Polish priests who were involved with the Polish Insurrection of 1863. In late 1873 or early 1874, Father Klawiter emigrated to the United States.

== As Roman Catholic priest ==
Upon reaching America, Klawiter served as an assistant in various Chicago and Pittsburgh parishes. In October 1873 he became the first pastor of Saint Stanislaus Kostka in Pittsburgh, which he established in a former Presbyterian church on Penn Avenue; a parish school was established in the church basement. However, inter-parish strife forced Bishop John Tuigg of Pittsburgh to remove Klawiter from his position in 1877. As Stanley L. Cuba well observes, Klawiter's problems at his first pastorate "characterize practically all of his subsequent assignments in both Polish Roman and National Catholic Churches." Such was the case at Saint Anthony's Parish, which Klawiter founded at New Poznan, (now Farwell), Nebraska in 1878. He left New Poznan in December 1878 to help found Saint Stanislaus Kostka Church in Saint Louis, Missouri, returning to New Poznan for just enough time to alienate the parishioners at Saint Anthony and to be forced to leave. Klawiter then moved to New York State, where he pastored Saint Hyacinth's Parish in Dunkirk (1881–1884) and founded Saint Adalbert's Parish in Buffalo (1886–1890). After various intrigues forced Klawiter from the Diocese of Buffalo, he pastored Saint Stanislaus Bishop and Martyr in Newark, New Jersey (1891–1892) and Saint Stanislaus Bishop and Martyr in Meriden, Connecticut (1892–1893). His final stint as a Roman Catholic pastor began in September 1893 at Saint Stanislaus Kostka in Winona, Minnesota, which was becoming known by now as the "Kashubian Capital of America." There he began the building of a huge new church but was forced, at least partially, by a feud with the Kashubian poet turned American newspaper editor, Hieronim Derdowski, to leave Winona in the Spring of 1894.

== As Independent Catholic priest ==
In 1895, Klawiter became pastor of Mother of the Holy Rosary, an independent Catholic church formed in Buffalo by dissident members of Saint Adalbert's. For this he was excommunicated by the bishop of Buffalo, Stephen V. Ryan. However, he fell afoul of a dispute between his parishioners over which independent Catholic church the parish would affiliate itself with, and left in 1896. He then pursued opportunities with Polish-speaking Roman Catholic parishes in Cleveland, Ohio and near Denver, Colorado. These failing, Klawiter associated himself in 1897 with Bishop Franciszek Hodur of the newly formed Polish National Catholic Church. He held several pastorates in the National Catholic Church before he left it in 1901 for the independent Catholic church overseen by Reverend Antoni Kozlowski of Chicago. In 1906, Klawiter relocated to Manitoba, where he became pastor of Winnipeg's independent Our Lady of Czestochowa Parish in 1907. He left, however, when it decided to affiliate with the National Catholic Church of Bishop Hodur. Afterward, Klawiter served as a mission priest in Mikado, Saskatchewan until his death on September 30, 1913. In the words of the Roman Catholic priest and chronicler of American Polonia, Father Waclaw Kruszka, it was easier to say where Klawiter had not served than where he actually had served.
