= Anne Pellowski =

Kashubian American author (1933–2023)

- Born: Anne Rose Pellowski; June 28, 1933; Arcadia, Trempealeau County, Wisconsin, US
- Died: June 14, 2023 (aged 89)
- Education: Library science
- Alma mater: Columbia University
- Occupations: Librarian and author
- Writing career
- Genre: Children's literature
- Subject: Kashubian-American experience

Anne Rose Pellowski (June 28, 1933 – June 14, 2023) was a Kashubian American educator, folklorist, and author.

== Biography ==
=== Early life ===
Pellowski was born on the family farm in the Trempealeau County town of Arcadia, Wisconsin, daughter of Alexander and Anna (née Dorawa) Pellowski, both of whom were descended from Kashubian immigrants. She was educated at Sacred Heart School in Pine Creek, Wisconsin; Cotter High School, and College of Saint Teresa in Winona, where she received her Bachelor of Arts in 1955. Upon graduation from Saint Teresa's, she studied at the Ludwig-Maximilians-Universität München and the International Youth Library also in Munich on a Fulbright Program grant. In 1959, she earned a Master of Arts in Library Science, with honors, from Columbia University.

=== As educator ===
From 1956 to 1966 Pellowski was employed as a children's librarian and storyteller with the New York Public Library. From 1966 to 1981 she was employed by the U.S. Committee for UNICEF as the founding director of the Information Center on Children's Cultures. After leaving this position she divided her time between writing (see below) and traveling throughout the world as a consultant to UNICEF, UNESCO, the World Council of Churches and many other international organizations. Late in her eighth decade of life, Pellowski continued to travel the world giving presentations on storytelling and writing and empowering her listeners to tell their own stories and write them down in locales such as Ethiopia, Rwanda, Kenya, Nicaragua, Peru and others. She continued this as time passed and enjoyed wonderful visits to all her nieces and nephews, grandnieces and nephews, and great-grand-nephews and nieces, scattered throughout the US. She also volunteered her time to give workshops in book making in local languages, and help in training for children's libraries in underprivileged nations.

=== As performer ===
Between 1964 and 1970, the record label CMS released about ten long-playing records of folk tales, "As Told by Anne Pellowski". These releases thematically covered different cultures, e.g., Norse Folk And Fairy Tales or The Star Maiden And Other Indian Tales. Some releases note that "the language has been selected for smoothness of narration".

=== As author ===
Pellowski wrote numerous works on the theory and practice of storytelling, ranging from popular children's handbooks to scholarly academic articles. These include The World of Children's Literature (1968) The World of Storytelling (1977, revised edition 1991), The Story Vine: A Source Book of Unusual and Easy-to-Tell Stories from around the World (1984), The Family Storytelling Handbook: How to Use Stories, Anecdotes, Rhymes, Handkerchiefs, Paper, and Other Objects to Enrich Your Family Traditions (with Lynn Sweat, 1987) and The Storytelling Handbook: A Young People's Collection of Unusual Tales and Helpful Hints on How to Tell Them (1995).

Pellowski was also the author of the "Latsch Valley Series" or "Polish American Girls Series:" five novels about life in the Kashubian Polish farm communities in Trempealeau County, Wisconsin. Each of the novels, Willow Wind Farm: Betsy's Story (1981), Stairstep Farm: Anna Rose's Story (1981), Winding Valley Farm: Annie's Story (1982), First Farm in the Valley: Anna's Story (1982), and Betsy's Up-and-Down Year (1998), treats one year in the life of a girl from four successive generations of the Pellowski family; a five-year-old Pellowski herself is the protagonist of Stairstep Farm. The novels were first and foremost intended as children's literature, and have been widely acclaimed for their success. However, the painstaking research and the abundant detail evident throughout all five novels marks them also as valuable historical-cultural documents in which, as Thomas J. Napierkalski observes, "Anne Pellowski has given Polish Americans a voice." In addition, Pellowski's novels are noted for moving "beyond the confines of Polishness through interethnic marriage and, more important, by showing the younger generation's acquisition of a global perspective."

== Honors and awards ==
- 1979: American Library Association Grolier Foundation Award
- 1980: Constance Lindsay Skinner Women's National Book Association Award
- 1985: Honorary Doctorate of Humane Letters, University of Colorado-Colorado Springs
- 1992: Notable Wisconsin Author, Wisconsin Library Association
- 2005: National Storytelling Network--Lifetime Achievement Award
- 2018 Anne Pellowski: Storyteller to the World film shown in premiere at Frozen River Film Festival; film's producer, Mary Farrell, given Viewer's Choice Award
