= Kashubian Cultural Institute & Polish Museum =

Ethnographic Museum in Minnesota

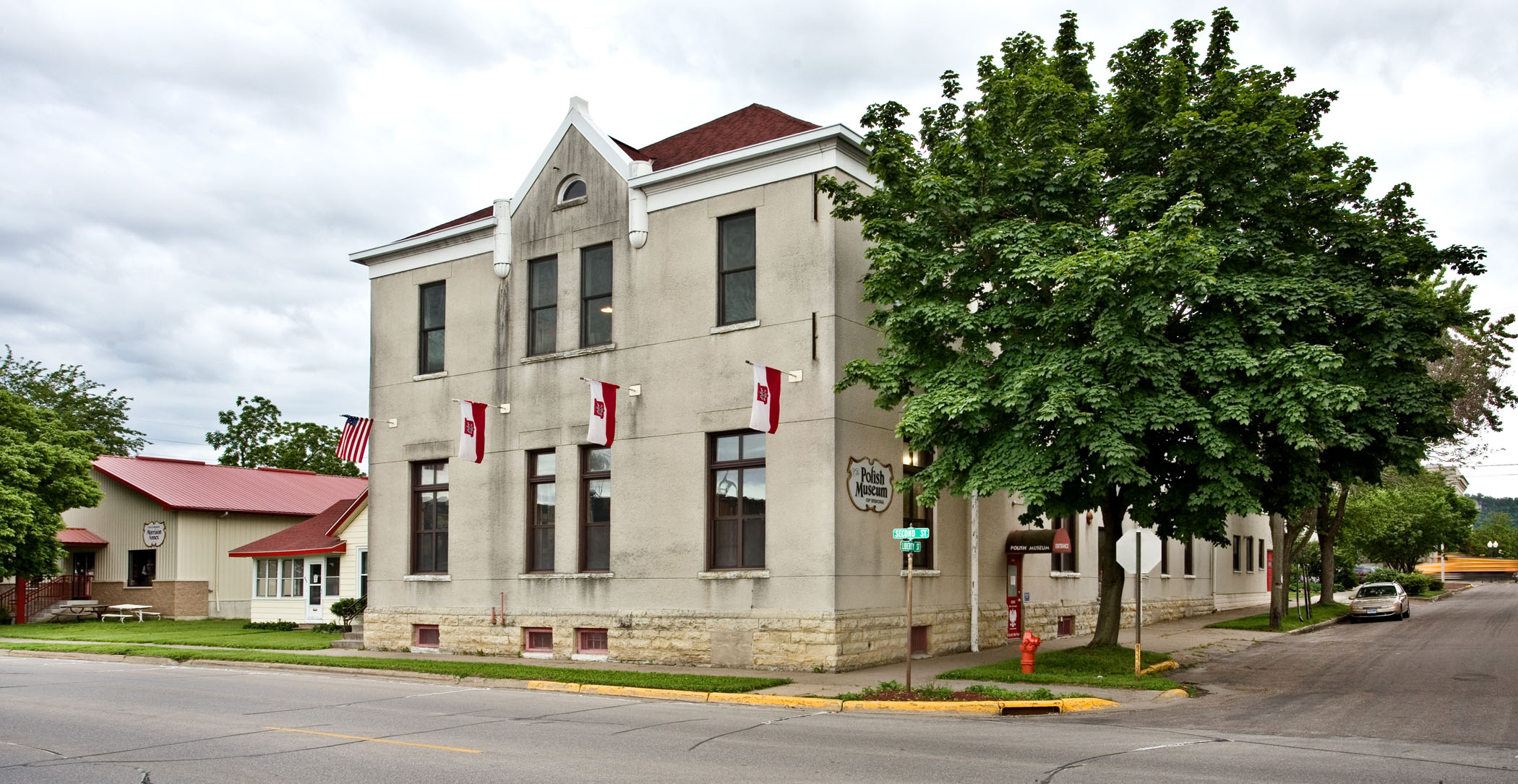
- Viewed from the intersection of Liberty Street and Second Street
- Established: 1979
- Location: 102 Liberty Street, Winona, Minnesota 559873, United States
- Coordinates: 44.05075°N 91.628°W
- Type: Ethnographic history
- Executive director: Jeff Turkowski
- Website: polishmuseumwinona.org

The Kashubian Cultural Institute & Polish Museum is a cultural and historical museum, founded in 1979 to preserve the Polish and Kashubian heritage of Winona, Minnesota. Known locally as the Polish Museum, it is housed in a lumber yard office built by the Laird-Norton Lumber Company in 1890, located at 102 Liberty Street in Winona, Minnesota, United States. The museum was formerly known as the Polish Cultural Institute and Museum, but through the direction of Jeff Turkowski, a Kashubian activist, it has since updated its name to expand upon the highlights of the Kashubian culture within Winona.

== The Kashubian Cultural Institute & Polish Museum ==
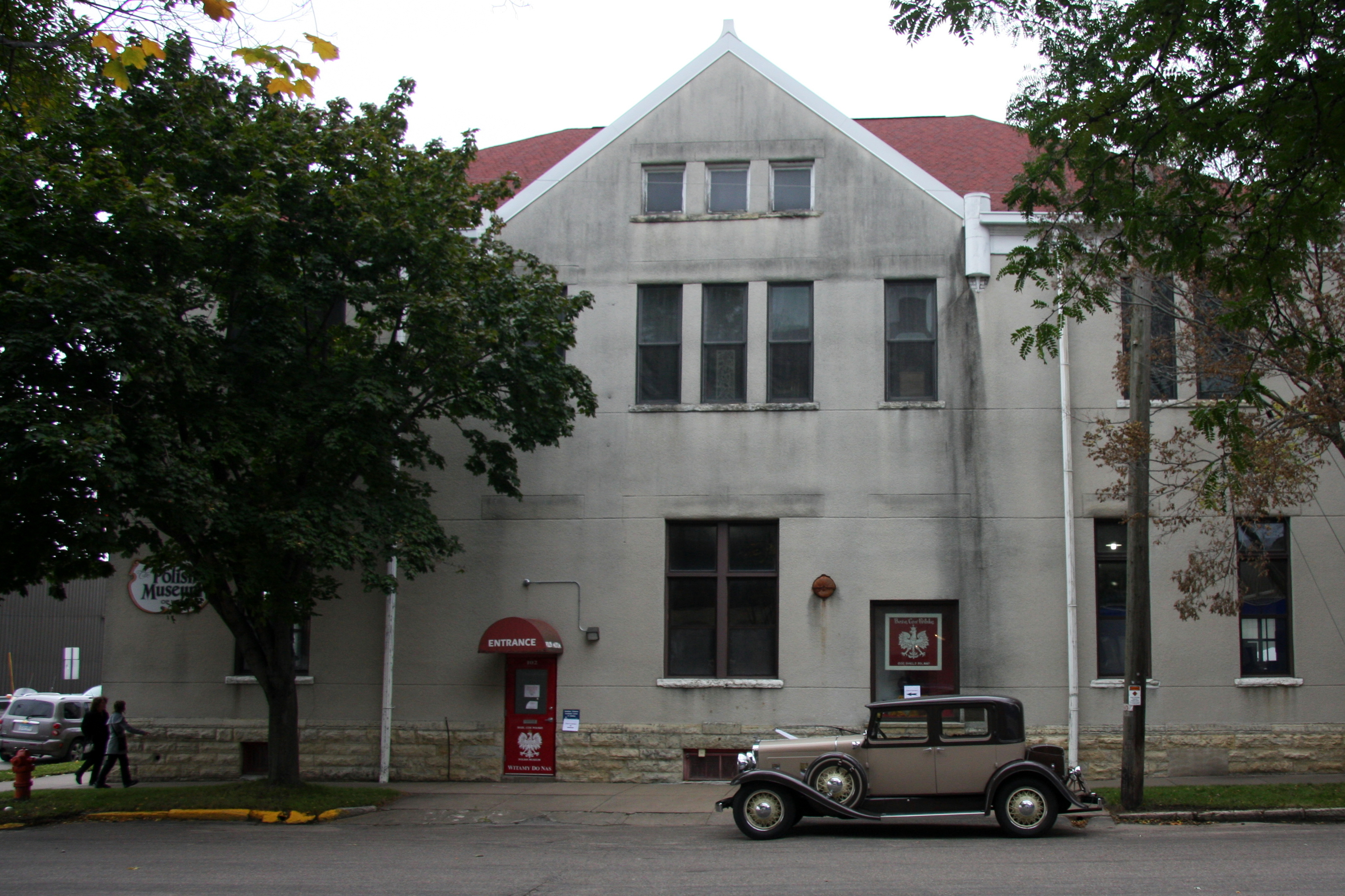
The front of the Kashubian Cultural Institute & Polish Museum

The Laird-Norton Building was purchased in 1979 by Father Paul Breza, a Winona-born priest of the Roman Catholic Diocese of Winona. It was intended to store historical materials pertaining to Polish immigrants in Winona, but disagreements within Winona's Polish community led to the formation of two separate organizations: the Polish Heritage Society and the Polish Cultural Institute. Under Fr. Breza's leadership, the Polish Cultural Institute was formally incorporated in 1979 to continue renovating the Polish Museum and to otherwise foster an appreciation of Polish contributions to the Winona community. The status of Winona as "Kashubian Capital of America" is also recognized by the Polish Museum, and has since been developed further with Winona's Sister City Program with Bytów, Poland.

In 2010, the Polish Heritage Society inducted Fr. Breza into its Polish Heritage Hall of Fame, formalizing a reconciliation between the two organizations. Another Kashubian-American activist associated with the Kashubian Cultural Institute & Polish Museum was the writer and educator Anne Pellowski, who was born in Trempealeau County, Wisconsin, but attended high school in Winona and lived there in her retirement.

== The Polish Museum ==
The first floor of the Museum building contains exhibits and other materials relating to Polish and Kashubian immigrant life in Winona and the surrounding areas. A gift shop offers for sale books, clothing, music and other items, many of which are imported from Poland. In recent years, two nearby buildings have been acquired: the Schultz House is being renovated to serve as a heritage house, and the Morrison Annex Event Center serves as a site for cultural events, such as dances and musical performances. The Morrison Annex Event Center also features a 165-foot mural illustrating the lives and contributions of Polish and Kashubian immigrant families in Winona.

== The Diocesan Collection ==
The second floor of the Museum building is devoted to a collection of artifacts recovered from churches in the Diocese of Winona, such as the Basilica of Saint Stanislaus Kostka. While this collection has been acquired and curated by Fr. Breza, the items themselves remain the property of the Diocese. The collection is extremely extensive and includes statuary, sanctuary furniture, vestments, and other semi-forgotten accoutrements of nineteenth-century Polish Catholicism in the United States. Occasionally, items from the collections are lent out to area Catholic churches seeking to enhance the historicity of their worship spaces.

== Cultural Activities ==
The Kashubian Cultural Institute & Polish Museum has always been active in fostering an understanding of Polish and Kashubian culture, whether the immigrant culture of Winona or that of modern Poland. In recent years, as appreciation of Kashubian-American culture has increased, the Kashubian Cultural Institute & Polish Museum has featured Kashubian customs (such as the Blessing of Flowers and "Smaczne Jablka" or Apple Fest) and reached out to Kashubian Poles, especially in the town of Bytów, which is one of Winona's sister cities. One regular activity is the exchange of high school students between Bytów and Winona. Another is musical presentations at the Annex, which range from local polka bands to the performance of recently discovered music written by Polish immigrants.
