= Jakub W.J. Pacholski =

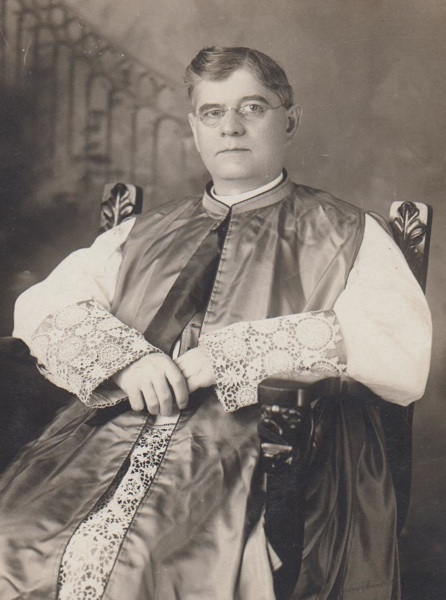
Monsignor J.W.J. Pacholski, circa 1920. Courtesy of Polish Museum, Winona, MN

Jakub Wałenty Jan Pacholski, better known in America as Monsignor James W.J. Pacholski, was born on May 24, 1862, in the village of Pączewo, located in the Polish region of Kociewie.

== Biography ==
Pacholski was educated at Pelplin and Wejherowo, and studied for the priesthood at Leuven, Belgium. After emigration to the United States, he completed his studies at Saint Thomas Seminary in Saint Paul, Minnesota, where he was ordained to the priesthood on June 18, 1886.

Just one month after his ordination, Reverend Pacholski was called upon to organize Holy Cross Parish in Minneapolis. He served as pastor at Holy Cross until 1894. He was then transferred to the Diocese of Winona and installed as pastor of Saint Stanislaus Kostka Parish, in Winona, Minnesota. This growing parish had experienced a good deal of turmoil in recent years, and it is clear that Reverend Pacholski was expected to bring some needed order. This he accomplished. Winona was already becoming known by this time as the "Kashubian Capital of America;" although not of Kashubian birth himself, he had studied in the Kashubian region and quickly bonded with his new flock.

As pastor of Saint Stanislaus Kostka, Reverend Pacholski oversaw the completion and dedication of the 1895 church, and of the parish school constructed in 1905. He was instrumental in the establishment of Saint Casimir's, a daughter parish of Saint Stanislaus Kostka, on Winona's West End, and celebrated the first Holy Mass at Saint Casimir's on Christmas Day 1905.

Father Pacholski held the office of Consultor to the Most Reverend Joseph B. Cotter, first Bishop of Winona, which was a very unusual honor for a Polish-born priest serving in an American diocese. He was elevated to the rank of Monsignor by Pope Benedict XV on August 17, 1918. He was admired and loved by his parishioners as a stern shepherd who always cared deeply for his beloved flock; in his role as pastor of Saint Stanislaus Kostka he was also regarded as the leader of Winona's Kaszubian Polish community.

The Right Reverend Monsignor Jakub W.J. Pacholski died unexpectedly of a heart attack on July 27, 1932, at the Saint Stanislaus rectory. He was succeeded as pastor by his former assistant, the Winona-educated Father Jozef Cieminski. There were as many as 2,000 mourners at his funeral, including over 100 fellow priests. Reverend Pacholski is buried at Saint Mary's Cemetery in Winona, alongside other leading clerics of the diocese.
