= Basilica of Saint Stanislaus Kostka =

Historic church in Minnesota, United States

- Bazylika Świętego Stanisława Kostki
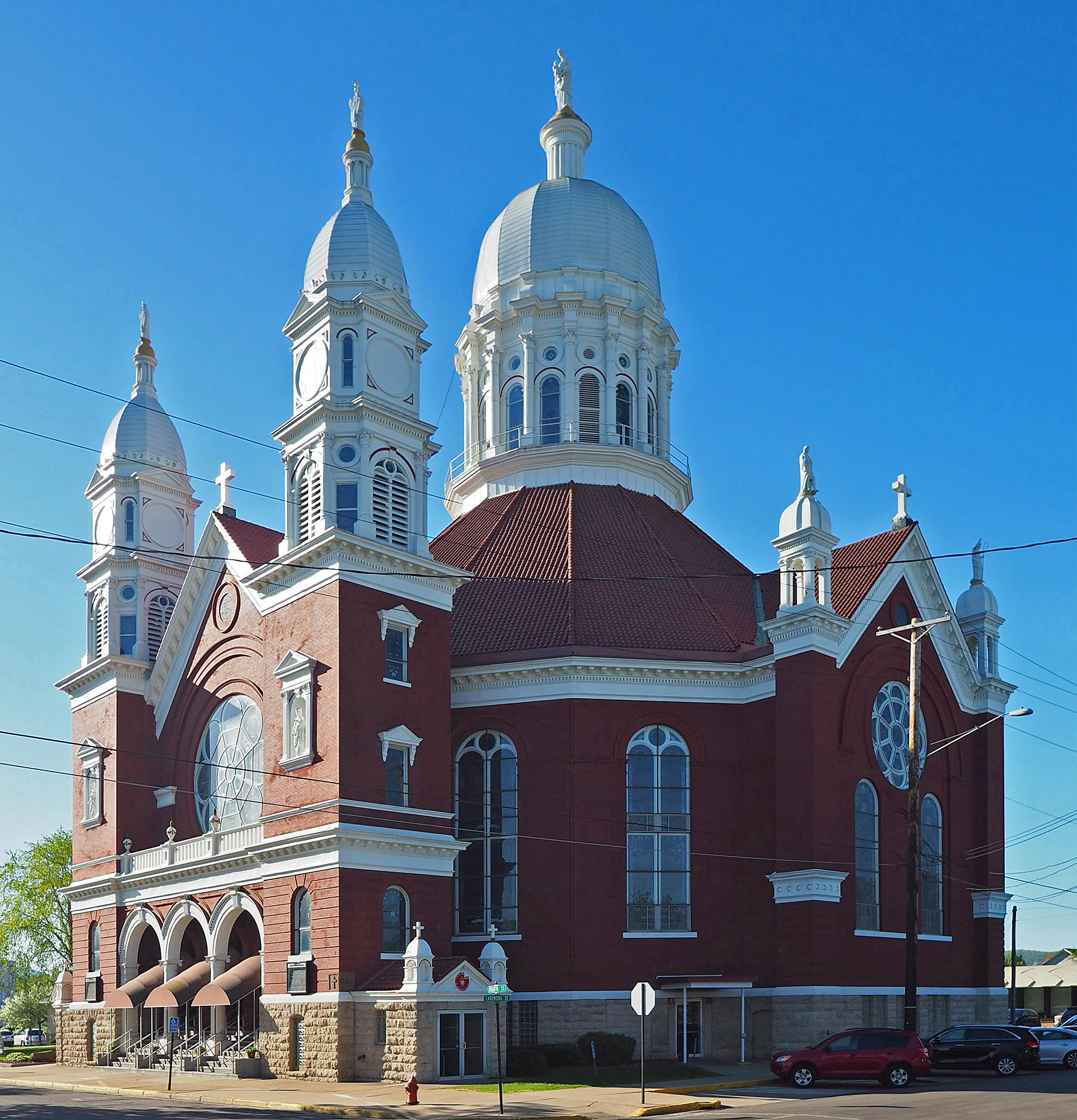
- The Basilica of Saint Stanislaus Kostka from the northwest

- Location in Minnesota Basilica of Saint Stanislaus Kostka (the United States)
- 44°2′49″N 91°37′20″W
- Location: 625 E. 4th Street, Winona, Minnesota
- Country: United States
- Denomination: Catholic
- Website: http://ssk-sjn.weconnect.com/

History
- Status: Minor basilica
- Dedication: Stanislaus Kostka
- Dedicated: November 28, 1895

Architecture
- Architect(s): Charles G. Maybury & Son
- Style: Polish Cathedral style
- Years built: 1894–5

Administration
- Diocese: Roman Catholic Diocese of Winona
- Church of St. Stanislaus--Catholic
- U.S. National Register of Historic Places
- Area: 1 acre (0.40 ha)
- NRHP reference No.: 84000251
- Added to NRHP: November 8, 1984

The Basilica of Saint Stanislaus Kostka (Polish: Bazylika Świętego Stanisława Kostki) is a historic church of the Roman Catholic Diocese of Winona in Winona, Minnesota, United States, and a prominent fixture on the city's skyline. Within the diocese it is known as Saint Stan's. It was listed on the National Register of Historic Places in 1984 as Church of St. Stanislaus–Catholic. It was designated as a Minor Basilica of the Roman Catholic Church on November 10, 2011 by Pope Benedict XVI.

== History of Saint Stanislaus Kostka Parish ==
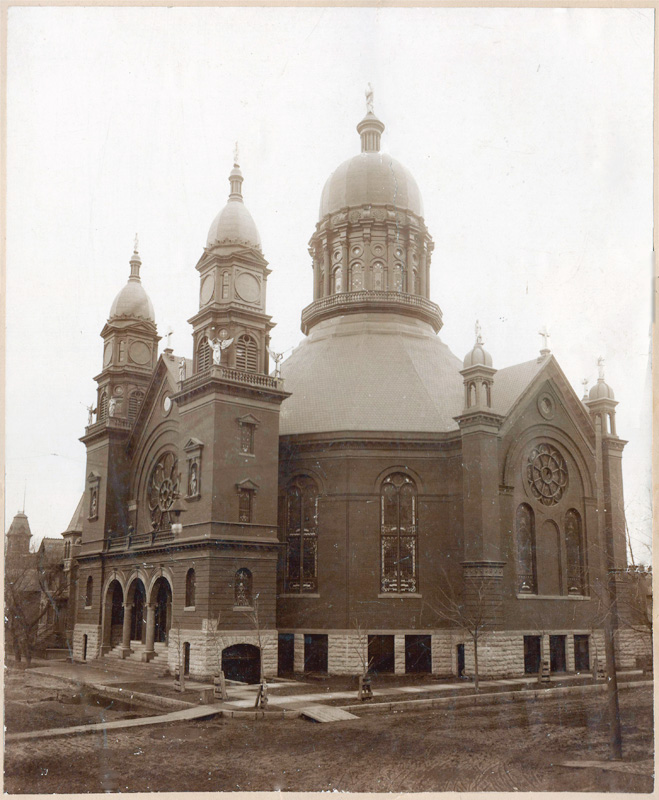
The Basilica of Saint Stanislaus Kostka, circa 1900. Courtesy, Polish Museum, Winona MN

The congregation dates back to April 2, 1871, when leaders of Winona's Kashubian Polish community formally declared its intent to organize a parish under the patronage of St. Stanislaus Kostka. Prior to this they had been attending Mass at either the "Irish" (Saint Thomas) or the "German" (Saint Joseph) Catholic church, but they wished to worship in their own language and to be led by a Kashubian or Polish pastor. Accordingly, a small wooden sanctuary was constructed at the corner of Fourth and Carimona Streets in 1872.

From its very beginning, the new Saint Stanislaus Kostka Parish served as the religious and the civic center for Winona's Kashubian Poles. The first permanent pastor was the Reverend Joseph Juskiewicz, who was succeeded in January 1875 by the Reverend Alexander Michnowski. In 1875, the Reverend Jan Romuald Byzewski (1842–1905), a Kashubian-born Franciscan forced to emigrate from German Poland due to the Kulturkampf, arrived and served as pastor until 1890.

Winona grew rapidly during the 1880s and 1890s, and the continuation of the Kashubian diaspora played a major part of this population boom. By 1893, Saint Stanislaus Kostka Parish had completely outgrown its old sanctuary. Creation of a satellite Polish parish on Winona's West End was considered; indeed, such a parish, Saint Casimir, would be established in 1906. The congregation was bitterly divided on the question of whether to build a new church or expand the old. But as a matter of religious and civic pride, the parishioners of Saint Stanislaus Kostka decided to build a larger, grander 1800-seat structure on the site of their present church.

== The Basilica of Saint Stanislaus Kostka ==
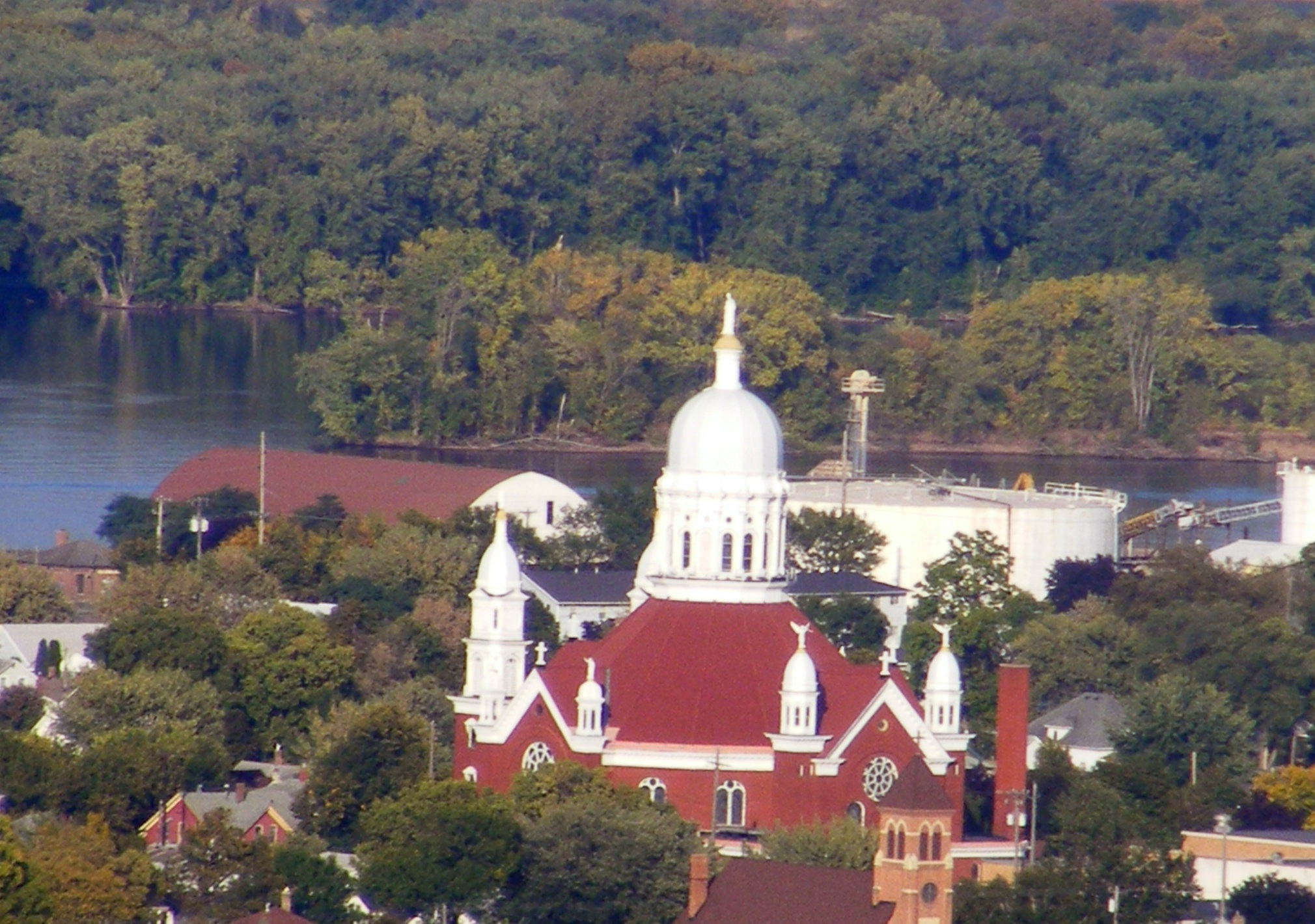

The Basilica of Saint Stanislaus Kostka was designed during the winter of 1893–4 in the Polish Cathedral Style (it has also been attributed to the Romanesque style) by the Winona architectural firm of C.G. Maybury and Son, which had also designed Sacred Heart-Saint Wenceslaus Church in nearby Pine Creek, Wisconsin. The old church was demolished in the spring of 1894, under the direction of then-pastor Reverend Antoni Klawiter. While the new one was built, the parishioners worshiped in the nearby Bohemian parish of Saint John Nepomucene. The foundation stone was laid by the new pastor, Reverend Jakub W.J. Pacholski, on October 28, 1894. The Basilica was dedicated on Thanksgiving Day November 28, 1895, by the Most Reverend Joseph B. Cotter, Bishop of Winona. From the very beginning, the Basilica's great golden dome dominated the skyline of Winona, testifying to the piety and thrift of the Kashubian Polish community which built it at the then-exorbitant cost of $86,000.

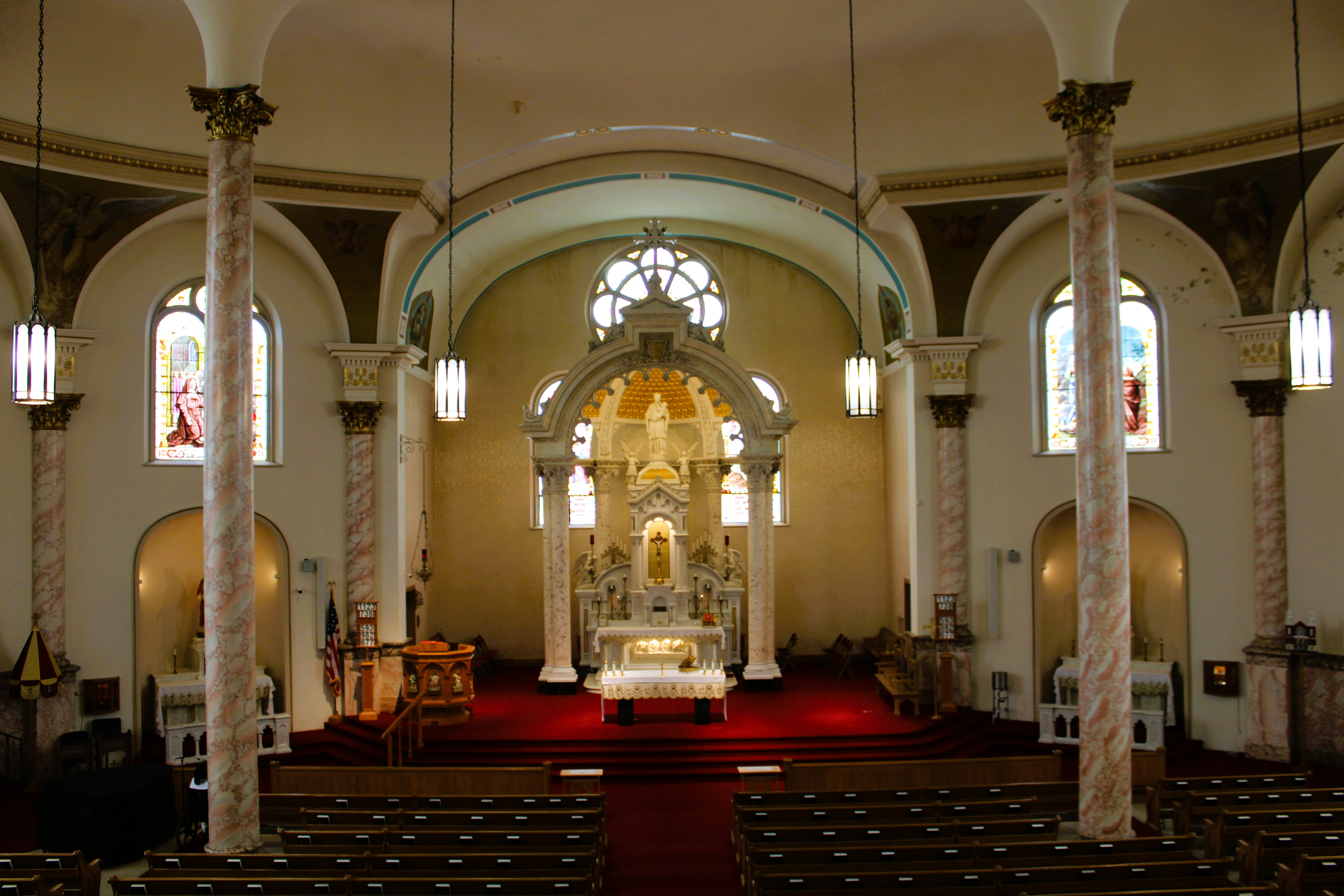
Interior of the Basilica

The Basilica's interior has undergone many changes over time. It is adorned with beautiful stained glass windows dedicated to various saints and devotions particularly cherished by Kashubian Poles, with inscriptions in Polish. On Thanksgiving Day 1920 the parish celebrated the Basilica's dedication by consecrating a massive marble altar with a canopy supported by marble pillars. New sanctuary furniture, new confessionals, and a pipe organ were installed by Reverend Pacholski's successor as pastor, the Reverend Jozef Cieminski (a parishioner in his youth) – along with landscaping of the entire church property. Some of the Basilica's original furnishings, along with many contemporary furnishings preserved from other churches in the diocese, can be viewed at the nearby Polish Cultural Institute and Museum.

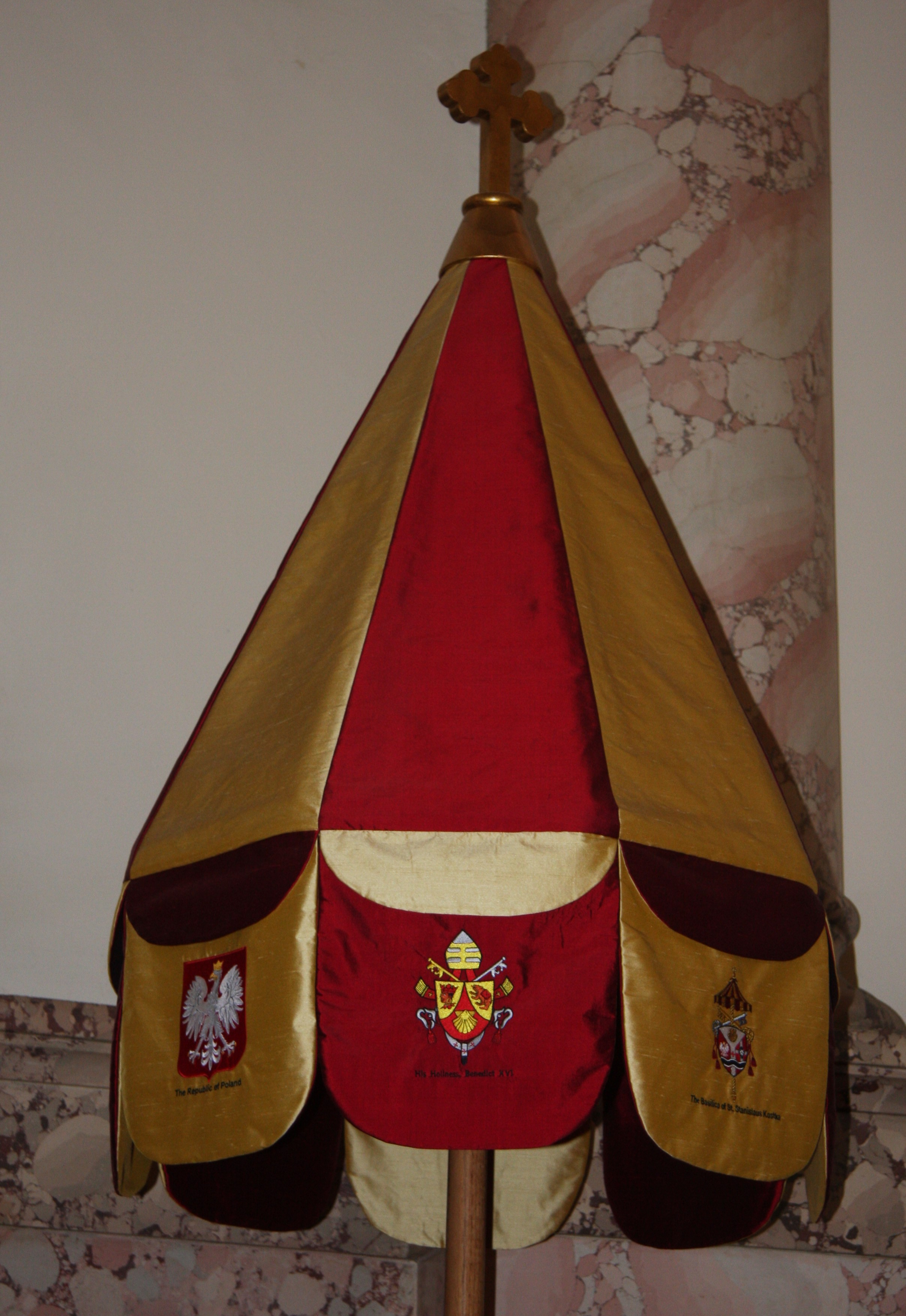
Umbraculum indicating status as a basilica

At 7:40 pm on Sunday, June 5, 1966, lightning from a severe electrical storm struck the Basilica's dome. According to the parish's Centennial History, the dome turned bright red when the lightning bolt struck and flames burst out the windows from the wooden framework inside. After costly and expensive repairs were performed, the Basilica was re-opened on Sunday, December 11, 1966. The Basilica's exterior was once more washed and renovated in preparation for the parish's centennial anniversary celebration on May 15–16, 1971. From 1991 to 1992 another extensive renovation project resulted in the main dome and towers being covered in metal. The seating capacity is now 1085 people, due to numerous renovations over the years.

The Basilica was listed on the National Register of Historic Places in 1984 for having local significance in the theme of architecture. It was nominated for its fine architecture, a prominent manifestation of what was for decades Minnesota's largest Polish American community. The official mass of elevation of the church as a Basilica was September 9, 2012. The tintinnabulum was rung at that time, but will not ring again until the visit of the pope.

== Saint Stanislaus Kostka Parish School ==
Founded in the early 1880s by Reverend Byzewski, the first Saint Stanislaus Kostka School was a one-room frame building. Classes were taught by the first parish organist, Dominik Hamerski. The school was gradually expanded to six rooms and on September 5, 1887, it was placed in the charge of the School Sisters of Notre Dame. A substantial brick convent was built for the Sisters soon afterward, to the east of the Basilica. By 1903 almost 700 students were enrolled in grades one through six, necessitating a new school to be built immediately south of the Basilica, completed in 1905. In 1966 this school building was demolished and a modern school building built in its place. This modern school building served as Saint Stanislaus Elementary School until 2023, when classes were moved elsewhere. The vacant building was demolished in April 2025.

== See also ==
- List of Catholic basilicas
- List of Catholic churches in the United States
- National Register of Historic Places listings in Winona County, Minnesota
