= Kashubian diaspora =

The Kashubian diaspora resulted from the emigration of Kashubians mainly in two waves occurring in the second half of the 19th century. The majority of Kashubian emigrants settled in the United States; others emigrated to Canada and Brazil. An online genealogical project, "The Great Kashubian Migration," is devoted to tracking their settlement patterns. Their reasons for emigration varied. Until the Franco-Prussian War, Kashubians emigrated primarily for economic reasons. After the Franco-Prussian War and especially due to the Kulturkampf, Kashubian emigration accelerated as socio-political factors came into play. In his 1899 book, Statystyka ludnosci kaszubskiej (Statistics of the Kashubian Population), the Kashubophile linguist and sociologist Stefan Ramult estimated that 130,700 Kashubians were living in the Americas.

== Reasons for emigration ==
The primary reason for emigration was economic. Kashubian farmers were not targeted by Prussian laws immediately after 1850. As the eminent Kashubian scholar, Professor Józef Borzyszkowski of Gdańsk University has observed, Kashubs were more or less comfortable with Prussian governance at the time. Rather, smallholders of all ethnicities were disadvantaged because the greater part of arable Pomeranian land already belonged to estate owners, and what remained was not particularly fertile. Another problem was the population boom among the Kashubs and Poles. Large families were typical of devout Roman Catholics, and in this particular case children were welcomed as additional workers. Once grown to maturity, however, the surfeit of young people were a further drain upon Pomerania's already strained fortunes. Recognizing this situation, the Prussian government tried to free up land by encouraging (but not forcing) Kashubs and Poles to emigrate. One very early incentive was inexpensive or even free travel to North America.

In the wake of the Franco-Prussian War and the unification of Germany, Kashubs and Poles met with institutionalized hostility. The Kulturkampf brought further indignities. It became illegal to use the Polish (and by default, the Kashubian) languages in public, including (or especially) church. By this time, too, the first wave of Kashubian emigrants had formed viable communities in towns such as Wilno (Ontario), Winona (Minnesota), Cedar (Michigan) and Stevens Point and Pine Creek (Wisconsin). Letters and remittances flowed from the contented North American immigrants, encouraging more Kashubs to try their chances in the West. One particular selling point was the availability of homesteads. Many emigrated; more, in fact, than the Kashubian immigrant communities could effectively absorb. As the Kashubian community within Germany became more self-aware (thanks to figures such as Florian Ceynowa and Aleksander Majkowski) it became more resilient in contending with the Germans; another result of the Kulturkampf was that Kashubs were more likely to make common cause with Poles. The primary sources of the twentieth-century Polish emigration boom were the Austrian and Russian zones of occupation.

== First wave (1855–1870) ==
Beginning around 1855, the Kashubian diaspora predated by at least 10 years the onset of the Polish American diaspora, which is typically dated to between 1865 and 1870. The first wave of Kashubian emigrants tended to sail from Hamburg to either New York City or Quebec. They emigrated in extended family groups that replicated themselves in North America. Portage County, Wisconsin's first Kashubian settlers, the Koziczkowski family, arrived in the fall of 1857. Renfrew County, Ontario's first Polish-Kashubian settlers are said to have arrived in 1858. The families that settled in Portage County and in Renfrew County quickly established farming settlements: Polonia, Wisconsin and Wilno, Ontario. Winona, Minnesota's first Kashubian settlers, the Józef Bronk family, are believed to have reached that community in 1859. The group of emigrants that came to Winona had trouble finding farmland in the immediate vicinity; consequently in 1862 the satellite hamlet of Pine Creek was founded about 10 miles away, across the Mississippi River in Trempealeau County, Wisconsin. The two communities remain closely tied to this day, leading to Winona's status as the "Kashubian capital of America."

== Second wave (1870–1900) ==
The pace of Kashubian emigration picked up as the Kulturkampf gathered force. The year 1872 saw the founding of a small Kashubian community on Jones Island in Milwaukee's harbor by Kashubian immigrant Jacob Muza. Unfortunately, the harbor land was too valuable and the Kashubs had never acquired title: the last Kashub settler was forced out in 1944. In the middle 1880s, a Kashubian enclave formed in the Chicago neighborhood of Lincoln Park, and the parish of Saint Josaphat was established there in 1884. In 1902, a huge new Romanesque church was completed there. In Winona, the Kashubian community attained such a size that in 1894 the Roman Catholic parish of Saint Stanislaus Kostka had to level its old sanctuary and build a new one seating 1800 worshipers. Since jobs in Winona's dwindling sawmill industry were in short supply, many of the newer immigrants proceeded west to newer Kashubian settlements in eastern South Dakota, western Minnesota and eastern North Dakota. Toward the turn of the century, minor Kashubian settlements were established in western North Dakota and eastern Montana.

== Location of Kashubs in the Americas, 1899 ==
Ramult's chapter on Kashubians in the United States was contributed by Hieronim Derdowski, the Kashubian poet and editor of the Polish-American newspaper Wiarus, who broke down America's population of 90,700 Kashubians state by state:

- New York: 7,000 Kashubs, in Buffalo
- Michigan: 5,000 Kashubs, in Detroit
- Minnesota: 6,000 Kashubs, in Winona and some small settlements
- Illinois: 30,000 Kashubs, in Chicago
- South Dakota: 500 Kashubs, in some small settlements
- Massachusetts: 200 Kashubs, in Webster
- Missouri: 1,000 Kashubs, in Saint Louis
- Wisconsin: 30,000 Kashubs, in Milwaukee (20,000) and Portage County (10,000)
- Other states: 10,000 Kashubs living in Pittsburgh, PA and Baltimore, MD

The Kashubian community of Canada is centered in Renfrew County, Ontario and often meets at the Wilno Heritage Society's park for an annual festival. Brazil's Kashubian population, which Ramult estimated at 15,000, is mostly located in the state of Paraná.
