= Washington–Kosciusko Elementary School =

- Washington-Kosciusko School
- U.S. National Register of Historic Places
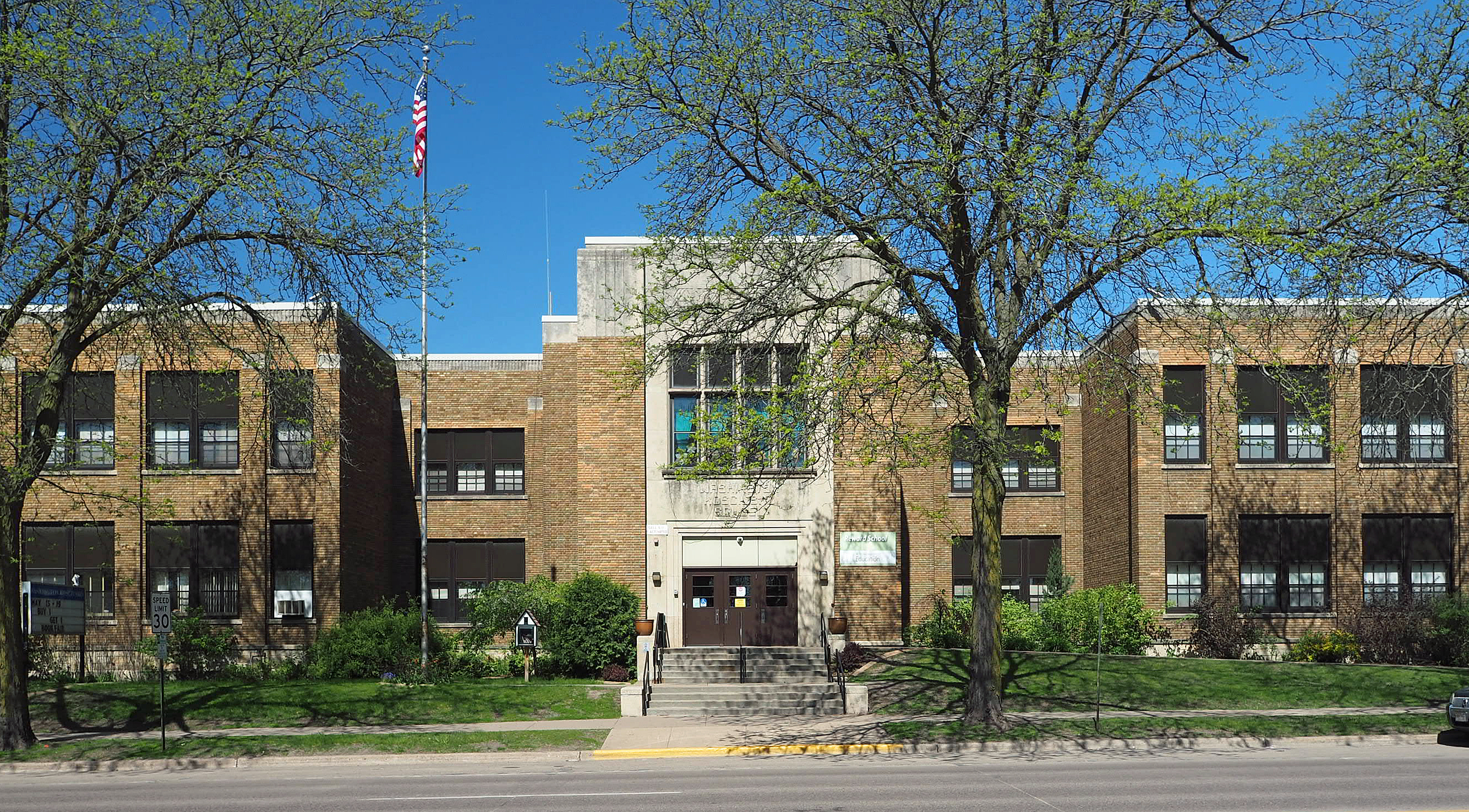
- The Washington-Kosciusko Elementary School viewed from the east-southeast

- Location within Minnesota Location within the United States
- Location: 365 Mankato Avenue, Winona, Minnesota
- Coordinates: 44°2′33″N 91°37′10″W
- Area: 1.98 acres (0.80 ha)
- Built: 1934
- Built by: Standard Construction Company
- Architect: Boyum, Schubert & Sorensen
- Architectural style: Art Moderne
- Website: https://wk.winonaschools.org/
- MPS: Federal Relief Construction in Minnesota MPS AD
- NRHP reference No.: 12000074
- Designated: March 6, 2012

Washington–Kosciusko Elementary School (W-K for short) is an elementary school in Winona, Minnesota, United States. Its building was constructed in 1934, the fourth of five new facilities built by Winona Public Schools in the early 20th century to implement progressive educational reforms. It was listed on the National Register of Historic Places in 2012 for its significance in the theme of education. It was nominated for representing the 20th-century development of Winona Public Schools and for being a project of the Public Works Administration, the largest federal relief program of the New Deal.

== See also ==
- National Register of Historic Places listings in Winona County, Minnesota
