= Winona County History Center =

Museum in Winona, Minnesota

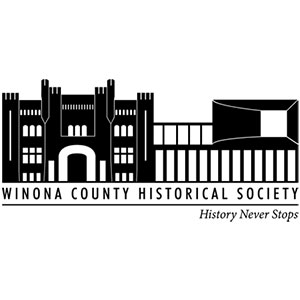

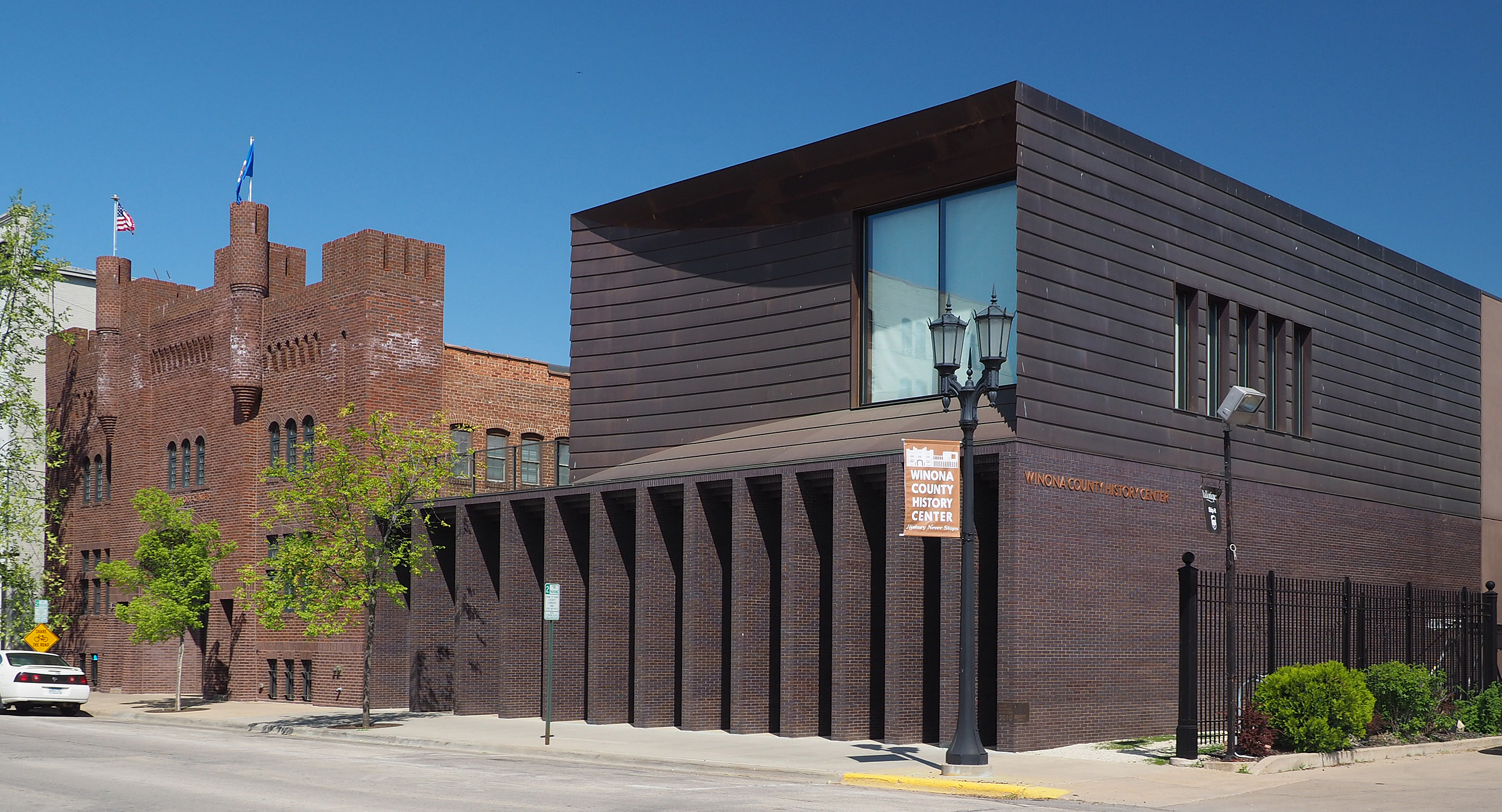
- Exterior of the museum
- Established: 1973
- Location: 160 Johnson Street, Winona, Minnesota, US
- Type: Local history
- Executive director: Carrie Johnson
- Website: winonahistory.org/

- Winona Armory
- U.S. National Register of Historic Places
- U.S. Historic district – Contributing property
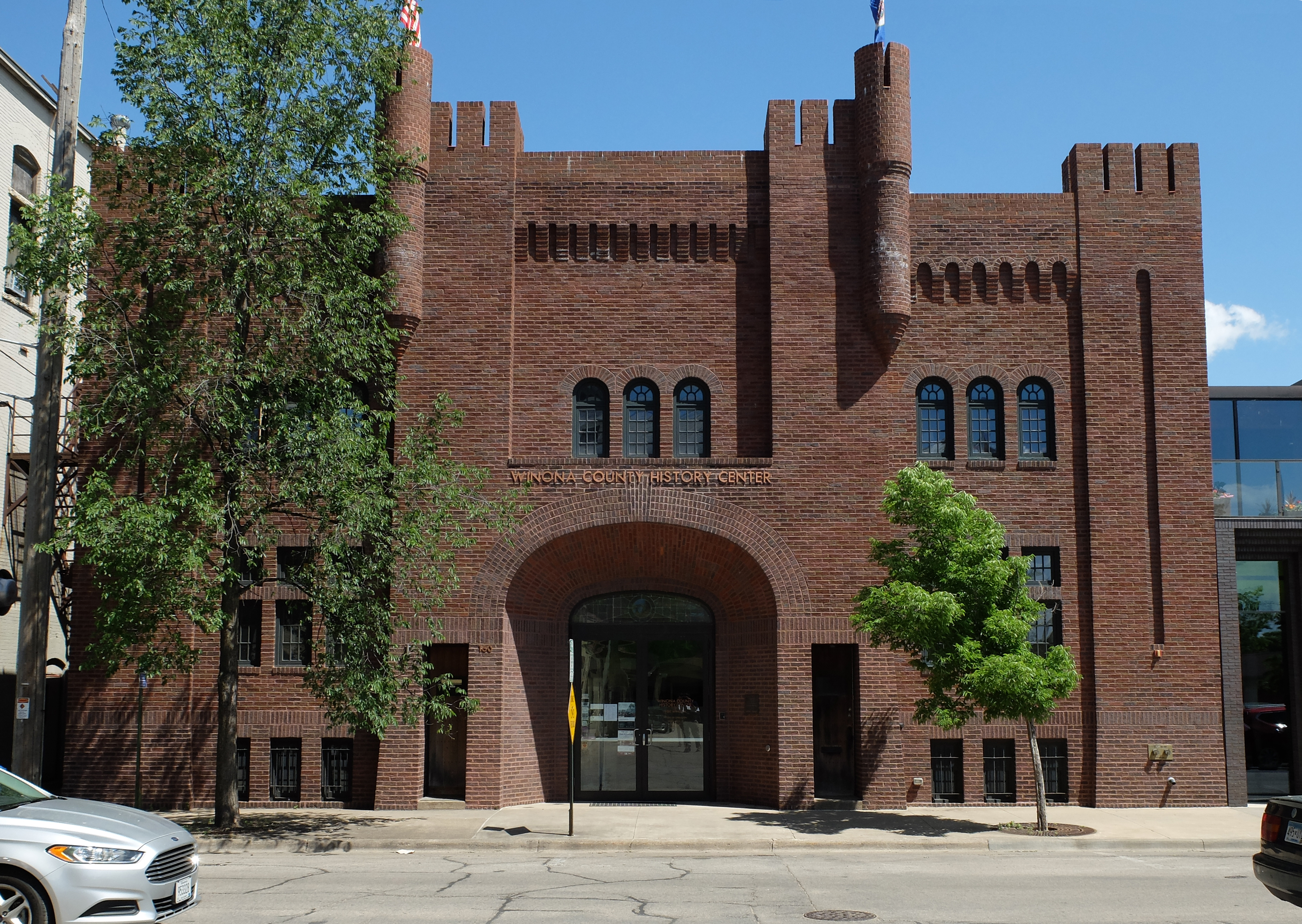
- Winona Armory now part of the Winona County History Center

- Location within Minnesota Location within the United States
- Location: 160 Johnson Street, Winona, Minnesota, US
- Coordinates: 44.052440°N 91.639210°W
- Area: Less than one acre
- Built: 1915
- Part of: Winona Commercial Historic District (ID98001220)
- NRHP reference No.: 83000947

Significant dates
- Added to NRHP: March 31, 1983
- Designated CP: October 1, 1998

The Winona County History Center, located in Winona, Minnesota, is made up of two buildings, the historic Winona Armory and the modern Laird Norton Addition. The Winona County Historical Society was established in 1935, and moved into the 1915 Winona Armory in 1973 and added the Laird Norton Addition in 2010. The History Center is the Society's main museum and houses collections, exhibits, offices, and hosts programming.

== Exhibits ==
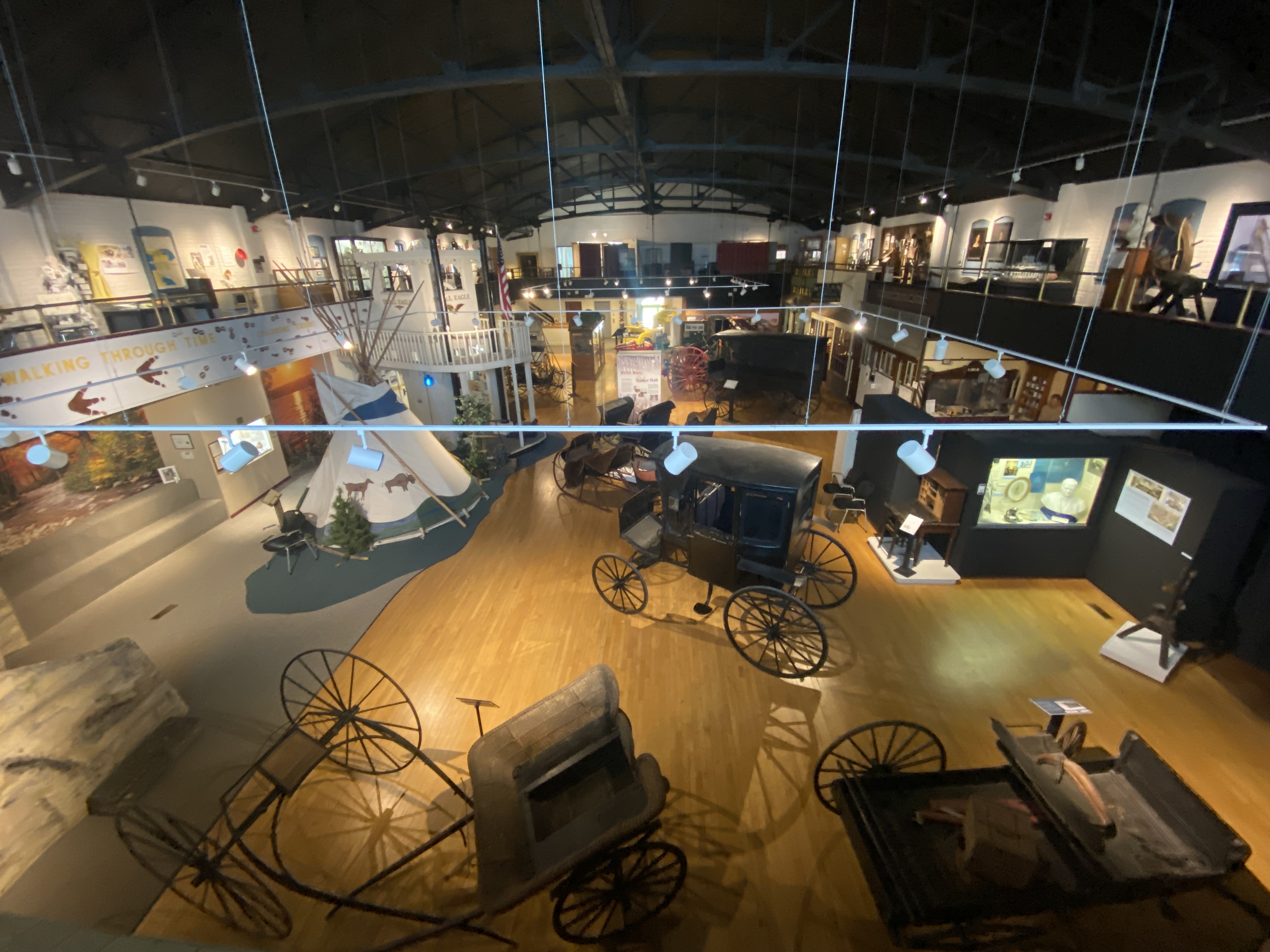
Exhibit in main gallery of the armory.

The museum features several floors of exhibits including topics about local businesses, cultural traditions, architecture, the arts, transportation, veterans, and much more. The gallery space in the Slaggie Family Lobby offers rotating exhibitions of artwork by regional artists.

== Programming ==
History on the River tours are offered in the summer, where once a month the society takes the Cal Fremling Boat, a Winona State University vessel, out on the river and offers a program during that time. Voices From the Past Cemetery Walk is held each October with community actors portraying people of Winona County's past within the historic Woodlawn Cemetery in Winona. Many various activities, classes, tours and fundraiser events are offered annually.

== Laird Lucas Memorial Library and Archives ==
The research facility houses genealogical and historical materials, including documents, photographs, and artifacts. It serves as a resource for researching Winona County's past.

== Governance ==
The Winona County History Center is operated by the Winona County Historical Society, a non-profit organization governed by a Board of Directors composed of community members. The Society relies on memberships, donations, and grants to support its ongoing mission of education and historical preservation.

== History ==
The society was established in 1935, with its first museum located on the second floor of the Lumberman's building, now known as the Laird Norton Center for the Arts. The armory was acquired by the society for use as its museum in 1973.

=== Laird Norton Addition ===
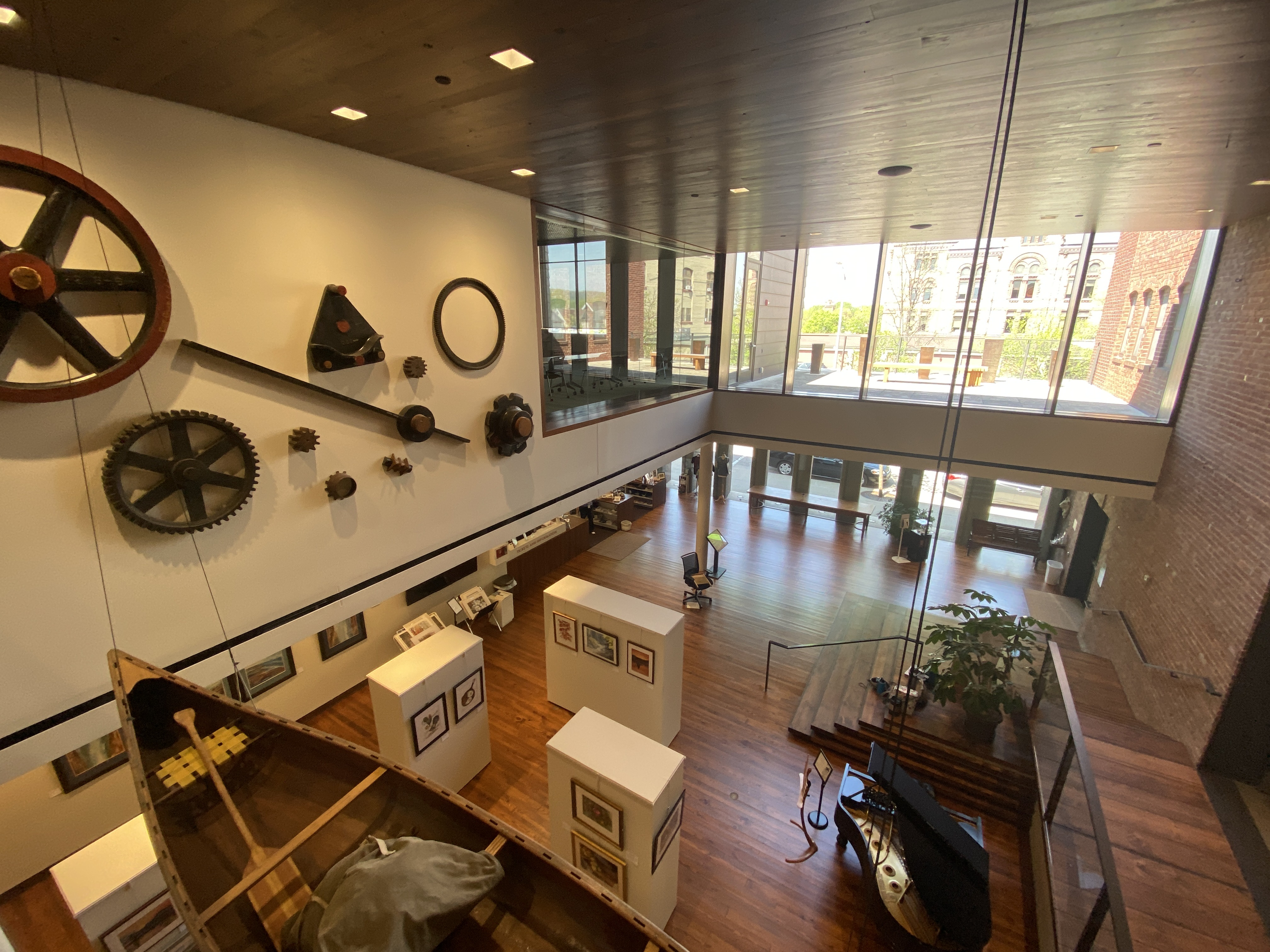
Looking down at the Slaggie Family Lobby

The three-story addition was designed by architect Joan Soranno and completed in 2010. The first level features a welcoming colonnade faced with brick that complements the armory's exterior. Capping the addition is a copper-clad multipurpose room with expansive windows offering views of the Mississippi River bluffs and the downtown area.

The expanded the physical footprint of the History Center and allowed it to offer a wider range of programs and events.

== Winona Armory ==
The Winona County History Center occupies a historic building itself. Originally constructed in 1915, the building served as the National Guard Armory until the Winona County Historical Society acquired it. The Armory's distinctive architecture, featuring castellations (decorative battlements), reflects its former military purpose. The symmetrical facade, resembling a medieval fortress, features a central "H" bay with an arched entrance, flanked by smaller bays with windows on multiple stories. Brick piers with round-arch slits and a corbel table top the parapet wall, giving a distinct medieval aesthetic. The 30,000-square-foot building once held a large, open room with a hardwood floor and balcony, dining room facilities, a shooting range, storage rooms and exercise rooms.

Constructed on the brink of the First World War, this edifice served as a hub for equipment, training, and drilling activities for Company C of the Second Regiment of the Minnesota National Guard. The Armory not only served the National Guard but also functioned as a community center from its inception. Hosting dances, banquets, sporting events, and auto shows, it was a hub of social gatherings until the 1960s.

== See also ==
- National Register of Historic Places listings in Winona County, Minnesota
- List of museums in Minnesota
