= Winona Area Public Schools =

School district in Winona, Minnesota

Address
- 903 Gilmore Avenue Winona, Minnesota, 55987; United States
- Coordinates: 44°3′16″N 91°40′16″W

District information
- Type: Public
- Grades: PreK–12
- NCES District ID: 2744070

Students and staff
- Students: 2,634 (2020–2021)
- Teachers: 173.14 (on an FTE basis)
- Staff: 232.53 (on an FTE basis)
- Student–teacher ratio: 15.21:1

Other information
- Website: www.winonaschools.org

Winona Area Public Schools, also known as Independent School District 861, is a public school district located in Winona County, Minnesota, United States. It serves the students in the cities of Winona, Goodview, Stockton, Rolingstone, Dakota, and Minnesota City. Brad Berzinski has served as the superintendent since July 2023.

== Schools ==
Winona Area Public Schools include six schools, an Early Childhood and Family Education program, and preschool available at Goodview Elementary and Washington-Kosciusko Elementary:

Schools in Winona Area Public Schools
School Name	Address	Grades	Type
Goodview Elementary	5100 W 9th St, Goodview, MN 55987	PK–4	Elementary School
Jefferson Elementary	1268 W 5th St, Winona, MN 55987	KG–4	Elementary School
Washington-Kosciusko Elementary	365 Mankato Ave, Winona, MN 55987	PK–4	Elementary School
Winona Middle School	1570 Homer Rd, Winona, MN 55987	5–8	Middle School
Winona Senior High School	901 Gilmore Ave, Winona, MN 55987	9–12	High School
Winona Area Learning Center	1299 West 3rd St, Winona, MN 55987	9–12	Alternative School
