= Winona Senior High School =

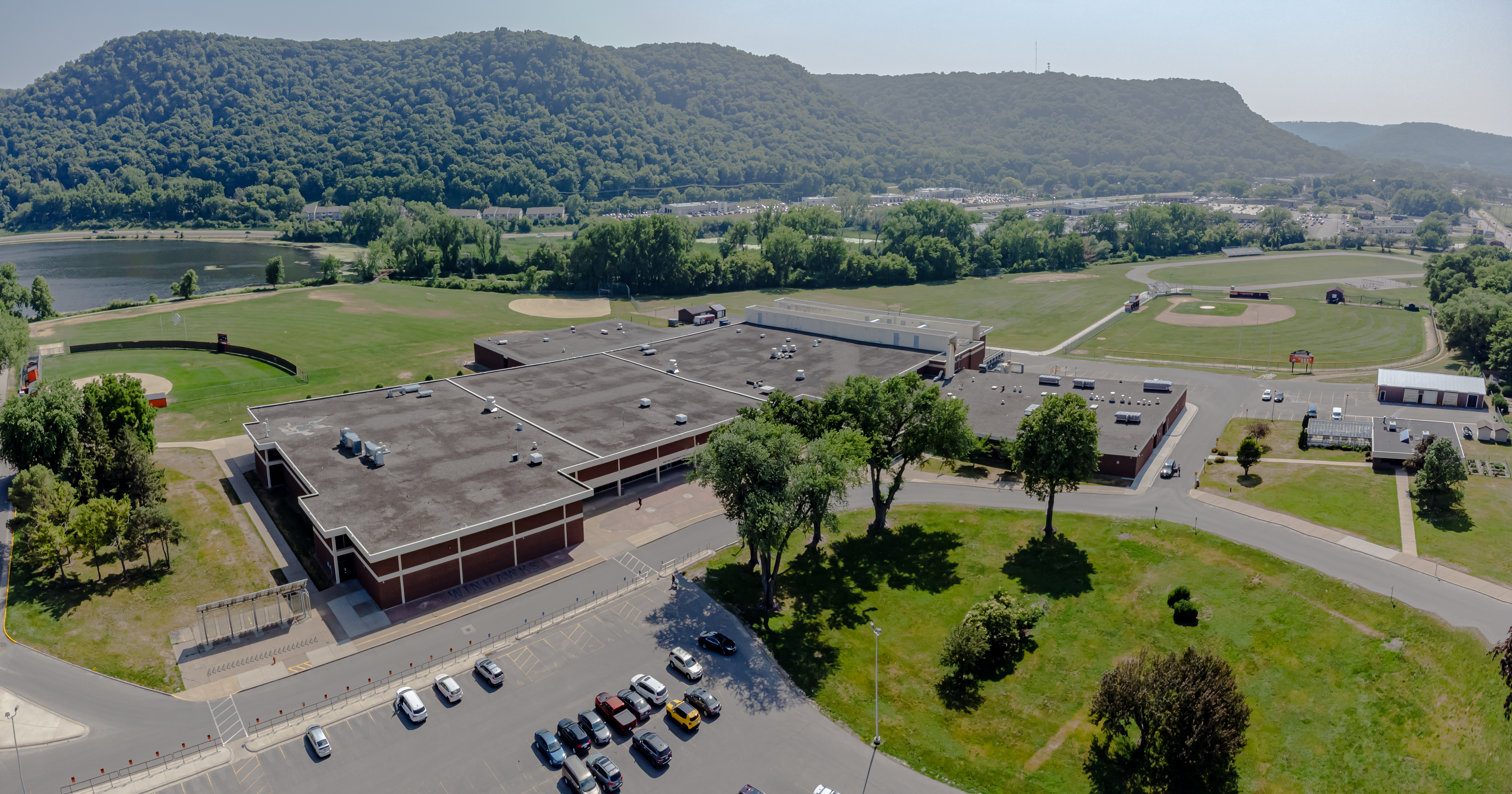

Location
- 901 Gilmore Avenue; Winona, Minnesota; 55987; United States; 44°02′47″N 91°39′43″W

Information
- Type: Public
- Motto: “Hawks fly together”
- School district: Winona Area Public Schools
- Principal: Mark Anderson
- Teaching staff: 47.03 (on FTE basis)
- Grades: 9 to 12
- Enrollment: 859 (2023-2024)
- Student to teacher ratio: 18.26
- Colors: Black and orange
- Athletics conference: Big 9
- Mascot: Herky
- Team name: Winhawks
- Website: www.winonaschools.org/wshs

Winona Senior High School is a publicly funded high school in Winona, in Winona County, which is located in southeastern Minnesota in the United States. The high school has a population of over 800 students in grades 9–12. The school's mascot is Herky the Winhawk. The school is part of the Winona Area Public Schools (Independent School District #861).

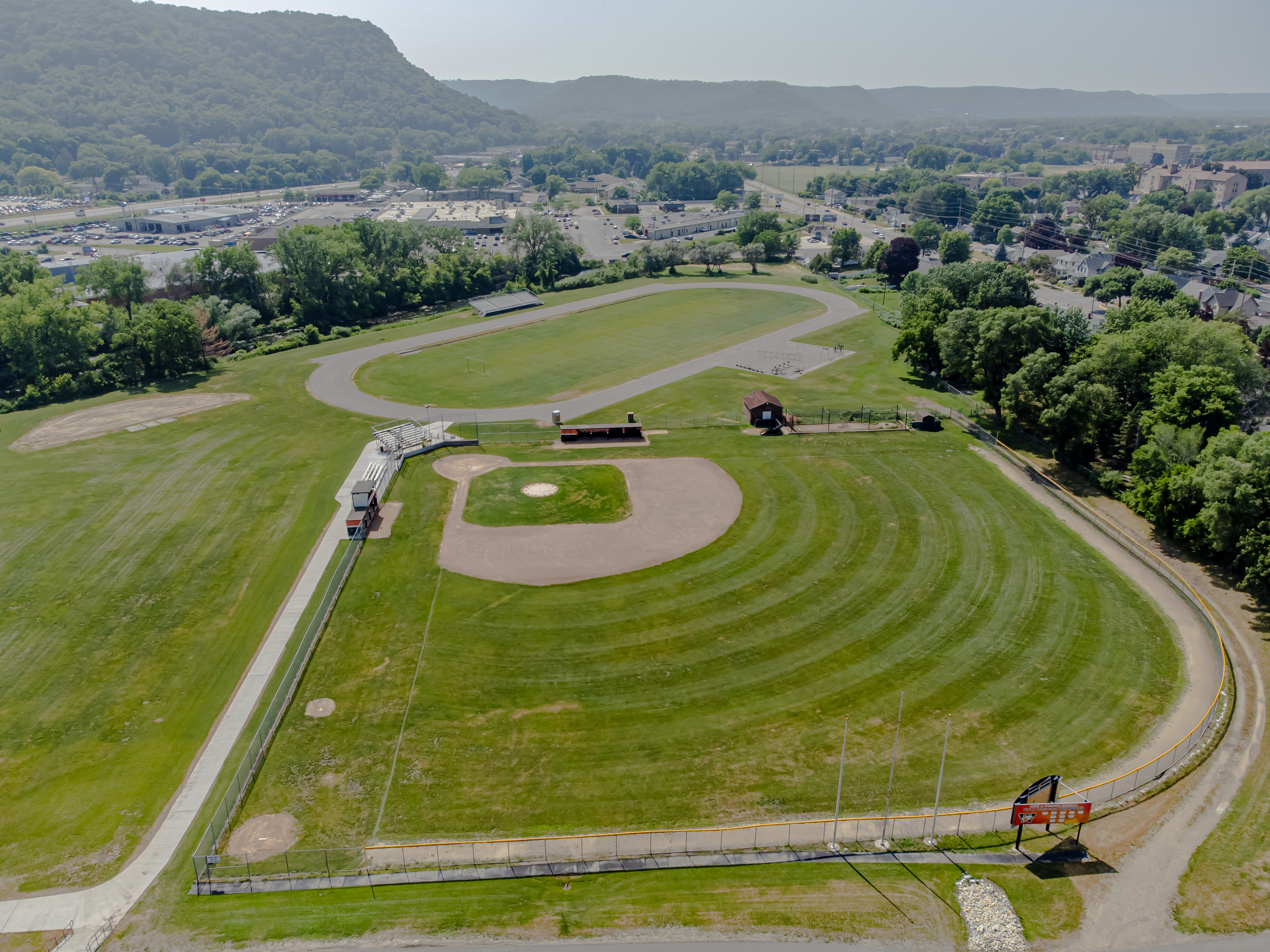
Athletic fields

== Notable alumni ==
- Alec Brown, professional basketball player
- Elizabeth Esty, politician
- Paul Giel, member of College Football Hall of Fame, Major League Baseball pitcher, and University of Minnesota athletic director
- Garrett Heath, middle and long-distance runner
- Elliott Heath, middle and long-distance runner
- Jeremy Miller, businessman and far-right politician
- Fred Risser, member of the Wisconsin State Senate
- Stephen S. Schwartz, judge
- Al Sheehan, entertainment businessman and radio host
- Tom Stoa, politician and beekeeper
