= Tom Stoa =

American politician (born 1951)

Tom Stoa (born July 7, 1951) was an American politician and medical doctor.

Stoa lived in Winona, Minnesota and graduated from Winona Senior High School. He received his bachelor's degree from Winona State University and served in the United States Merchant Marines. Stoa was also a beekeeper. Stoa served in the Minnesota House of Representatives from 1977 to 1980 and was a Democrat.
