= Corey Schell =

American archer

Corey Joseph Schell
- Corey Schell
- Born: Winona, Minnesota
- Occupation: American Professional Bowhunter

Corey Schell is an American professional bowhunter and archer. He received national exposure from Kicking Bear One-on-One as well as being on National pro-staffs for Bowtech Archery (former), HOYT (former), HHA Sports (former), Easton Archery, SKB Cases, Spot-Hogg, Athens Archery, Alpen Optics, Flex Fletch, Pine Ridge Archery, Advanced Treestand Technologies, Under Armour, Schmidty's Specialty Strings, HUK Fishing, NOMAD and Firenock. He is also the CEO of Unscripted Outdoors which produces the web based show Hunt Nasty TV and has appeared on the TV show Midwest Whitetail.

== Professional ==
Corey is a professional bowhunter and mentor from the Winona, Minnesota area. He has been bowhunting since he was twelve and has been shooting bow since he was four.

Corey is involved with and organization called Kicking Bear One-on-One camp for kids founded by world famous bowhunter Ray Howell. Kicking Bear is a nationwide mentoring program that takes at-risk youth into the outdoors and introduces them to the sport of archery. Corey also writes stories and articles for bowhunting.net and kickingbear.org. He got his start in archery from his father and started 3-D shoots at a very young age, from there he came to become one of the best young shots in the tri-state area. Corey is involved with many things, he is the Lewiston Sportsmen's Club Vice-President, a firearms and bowhunter safety instructor, he is the past historian for the LSC, he holds spots on the pro staffs of many hunting companies like, Bowtech Archery, Easton Arrows, HHA Sports, Firenock, SKB Cases, Alpen Optics, Spot Hogg, Flex Fletch, and of course Kicking Bear One-on-One, where he is an advisor and helps plan events all over the United States.

Corey also writes for bowhunting.net

=== Kicking Bear 1-on-1 ===
Kicking Bear is a nationwide mentoring program which introduces disadvantaged children to the great outdoors. Kicking Bear is a national organization with 501(c)(3) status, dedicated to enriching the lives of troubled and at risk youth through outdoor experiences.

This includes but is not limited to the following:

- Raising awareness about the significant number of young people who need a mentor.
- Organizing public events which have a positive impact on the young people who need it the most.
- Providing a point of contact for both mentors and the young people desiring a mentor.
- Teaching proven tips and techniques to aspiring mentors.

Kicking Bear encourages mentors to get involved with today's youth, especially the underprivileged, who have not been introduced to the outdoors.

Corey and his father, Rick, host Rick Schell's Kicking Bear Easter Shed Hunt each year around Easter. The event involves taking children into wooded areas to search for deer antler sheds. Participation is free for the children and supported by sponsors.

Kicking Bear's Founder Ray Howell was up for an award from Outdoor Life Magazine in 2007 and he won and accepted his award at the 2008 SHOT Show held in Las Vegas, Nevada.
