= Winona, Minnesota =

City in Minnesota, United States

- City
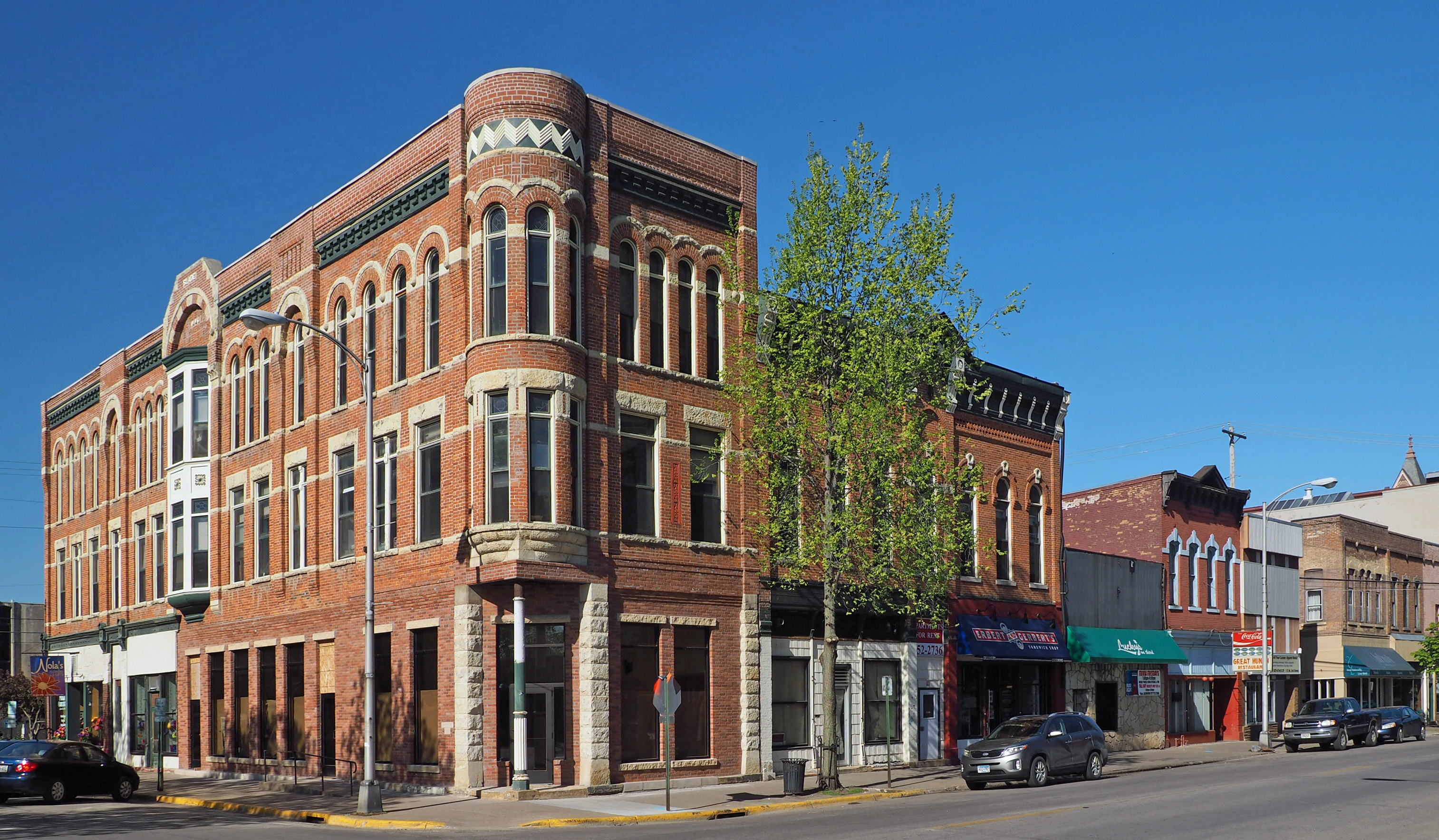
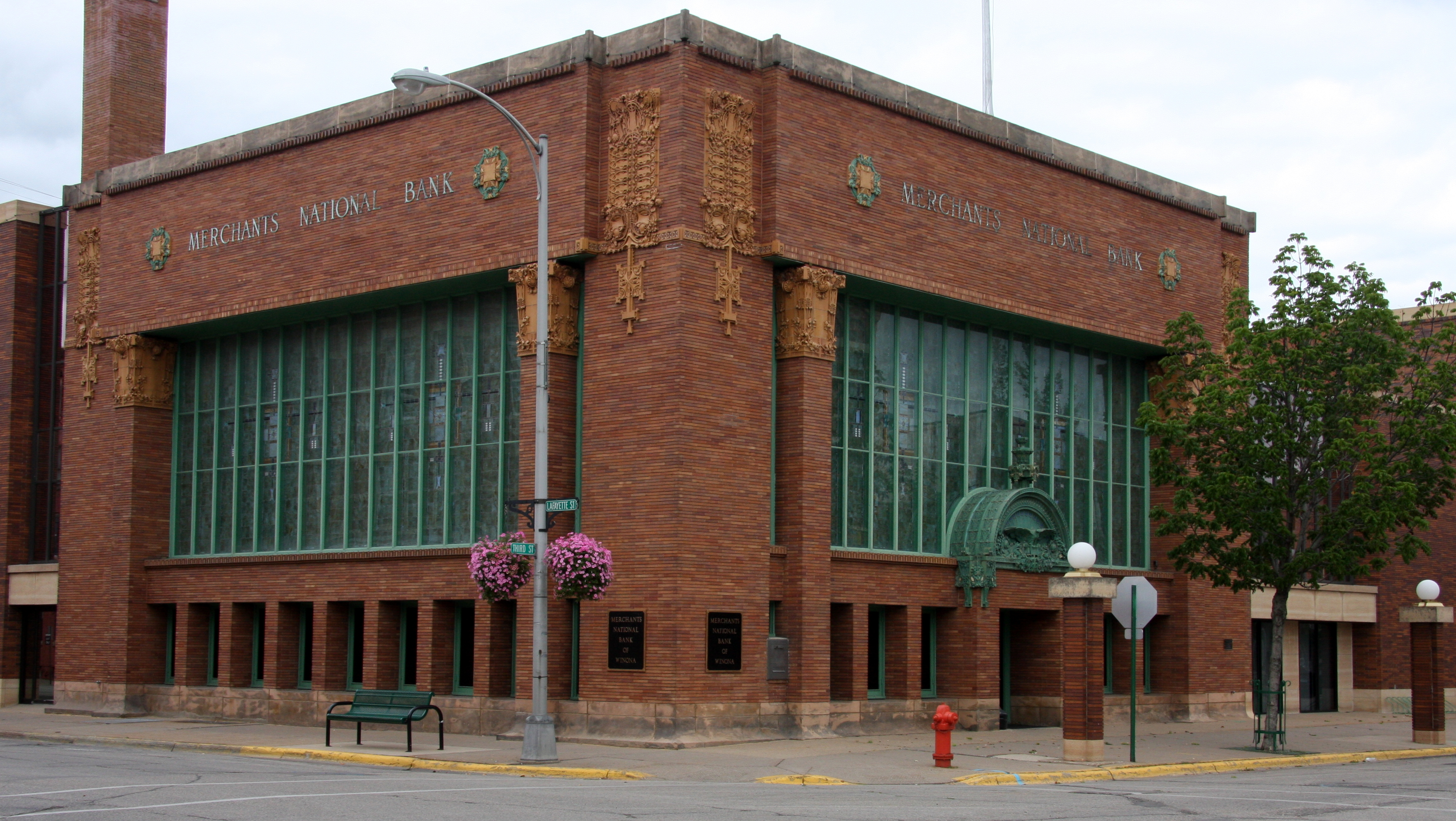
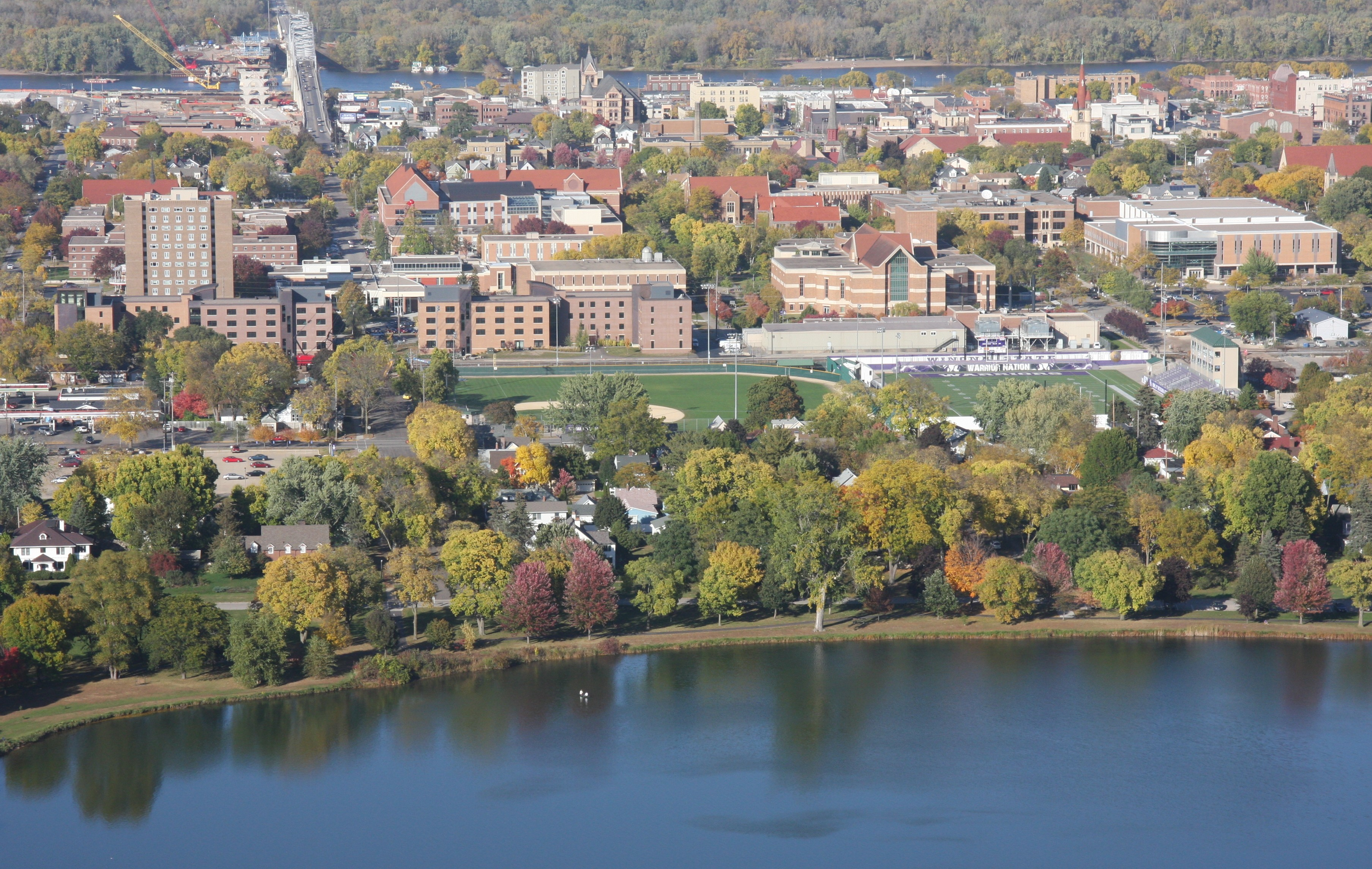
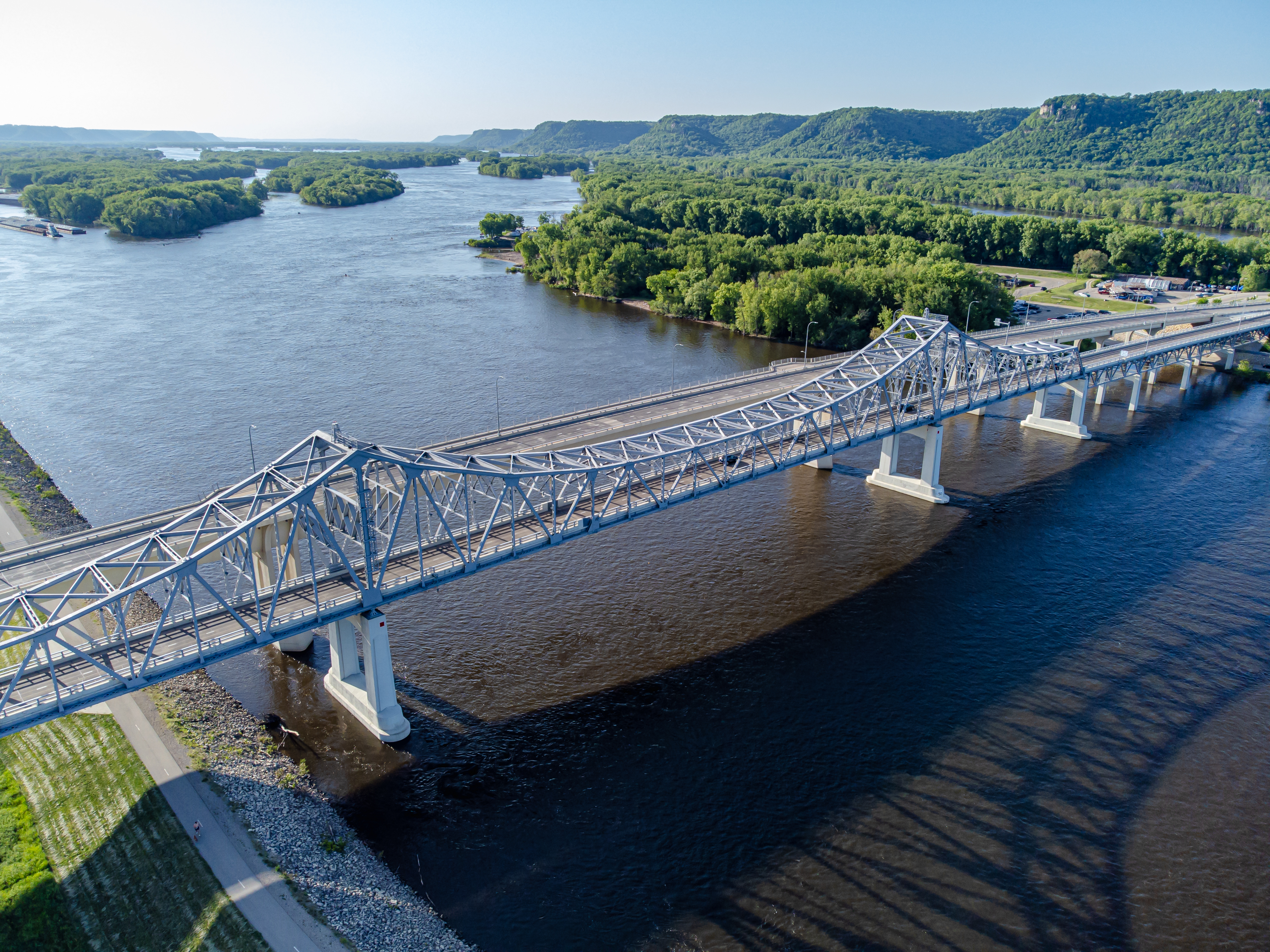
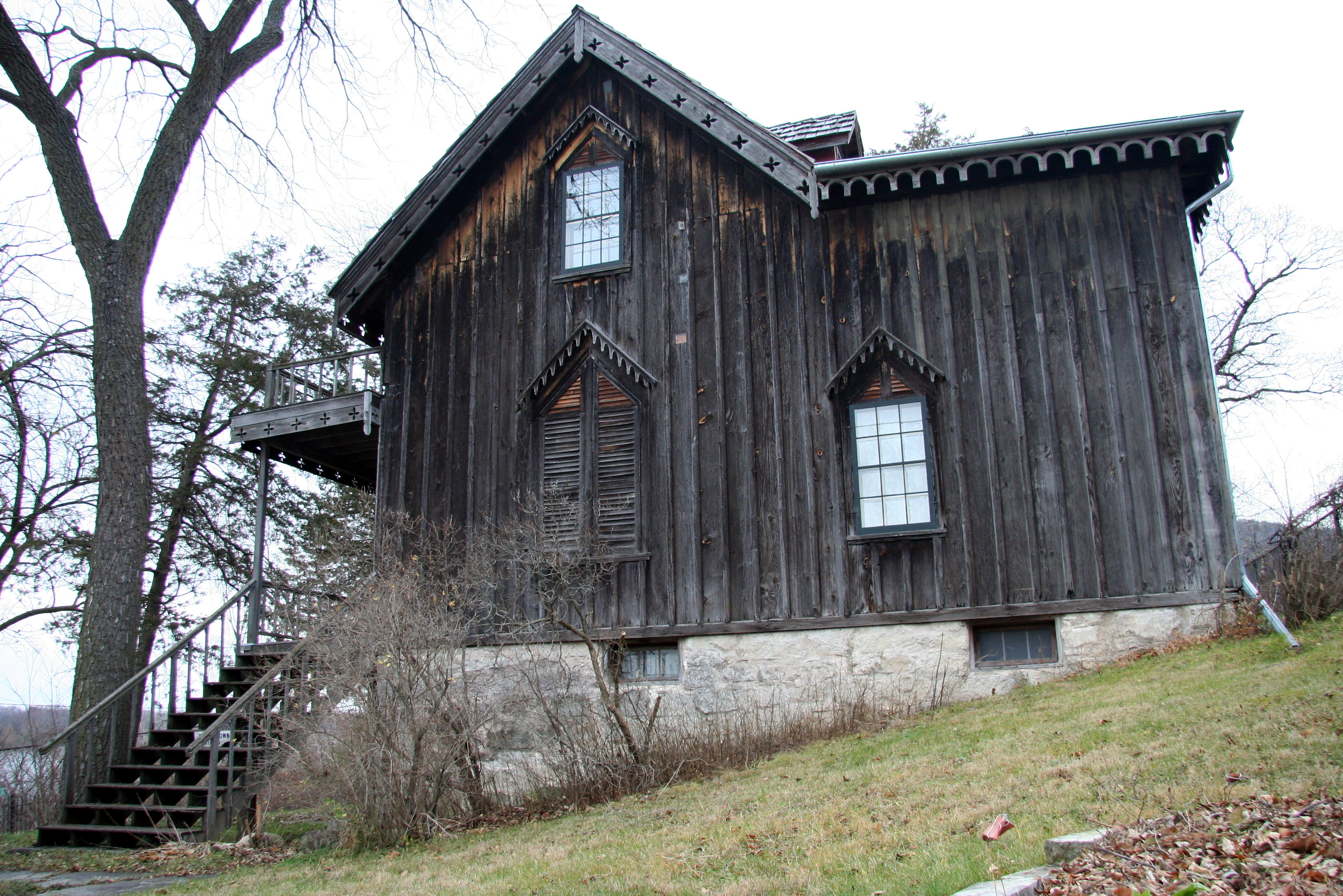
- Downtown Winona Merchants National Bank Winona State University Main Channel Bridge Willard Bunnell House
- Nickname: The Island City
- Location of the city of Winona within Winona County in the state of Minnesota
- Coordinates: 44°03′02″N 91°40′06″W
- Country: United States
- State: Minnesota
- County: Winona
- Founded: 1851
- Incorporated: March 6, 1857

Government
  - Type: Mayor - Council
  - Mayor: Scott Sherman

Area
  - Total: 24.32 sq mi (62.98 km^{2})
  - Land: 19.03 sq mi (49.29 km^{2})
  - Water: 5.29 sq mi (13.70 km^{2})
- Elevation: 659 ft (201 m)

Population (2020)
  - Total: 25,948
  - Estimate (2022): 25,842
  - Density: 1,363.5/sq mi (526.46/km^{2})
- Time zone: UTC–6 (Central (CST))
  - Summer (DST): UTC–5 (CDT)
- ZIP code: 55987
- Area code: 507
- FIPS code: 27-71032
- GNIS feature ID: 2397348
- Website: www.winonamn.gov

Winona (/wɪnˈoʊnə/ win-OH-nə) is a city in and the county seat of Winona County, Minnesota, United States. The population was 25,948 at the 2020 census. Located in bluff country, otherwise known as the Driftless Area on the Mississippi River, its most noticeable physical landmark is Sugar Loaf. Winona is the home of Winona State University, Saint Mary's University of Minnesota, and the Minnesota Marine Art Museum.

== History ==
The site was of the village of Keoxa of Dakota people. But the name "Keoxa" is known only from one non-contemporary source, Edward Duffield Neill's The history of Minnesota—from the earliest French explorations to the present times. According to Neill, "Keoxa" best translated to "Homestead", and the name comes from annual ceremonial gatherings held there to honor the dead. The French knew the areas as La Prairie Aux-Ailes. The first American visitors called it Wahpasha's Prairie. The modern city is named after Winona, a figure in a Dakota legend.

European immigrants settled the area in 1851 and laid out the town into lots in 1852 and 1853. The first were from New England. The population increased from 815 in December 1855 to 3,000 in December 1856. In 1856, German immigrants arrived. The Germans and the Yankees worked together planting trees and building businesses based on lumber, wheat, steamboating, and railroads. Between 1859 and 1900, some 5,000 Poles and closely related Kashubians emigrated to Winona, making up one quarter of the population. Since 80% of them were Kashubians, Winona became known as the "Kashubian Capital of America". As a result of the influx of Polish Catholic immigrants, the Basilica of Saint Stanislaus Kostka (now Basilica of St. Stanislaus Kostka) was built. For a time, Winona had more millionaires than any other city of its size in the United States.

The railroad and steamboat transportation industries helped Winona grow into a small city that diversified into wheat milling and lumber production. In 1856, more than 1,300 steamboats stopped at Winona. The Winona and St. Peter Railroad's first segment of 11 miles (18 km) from Winona to Stockton, Minnesota, was completed by the end of 1862. Winona then had Minnesota's second operational railroad, after the St. Paul and Pacific Line from Saint Paul to Saint Anthony Falls. In December 1870, the Mississippi River was bridged at Winona by the Winona Rail Bridge. In 1892, a wagon toll-bridge over the Mississippi, a steel high-bridge, was completed and remained in service until the Main Channel Bridge opened in 1942.

Winona has two historic districts listed on the National Register of Historic Places that combine into a single local historic district administered by the city's Heritage Preservation Commission.

A bandshell was completed in 1924 for outdoor musical performances and events. The Winona Municipal Band holds concerts there during the summer.

Valley of the Mississippi from Winona, c. 1898

== Geography ==
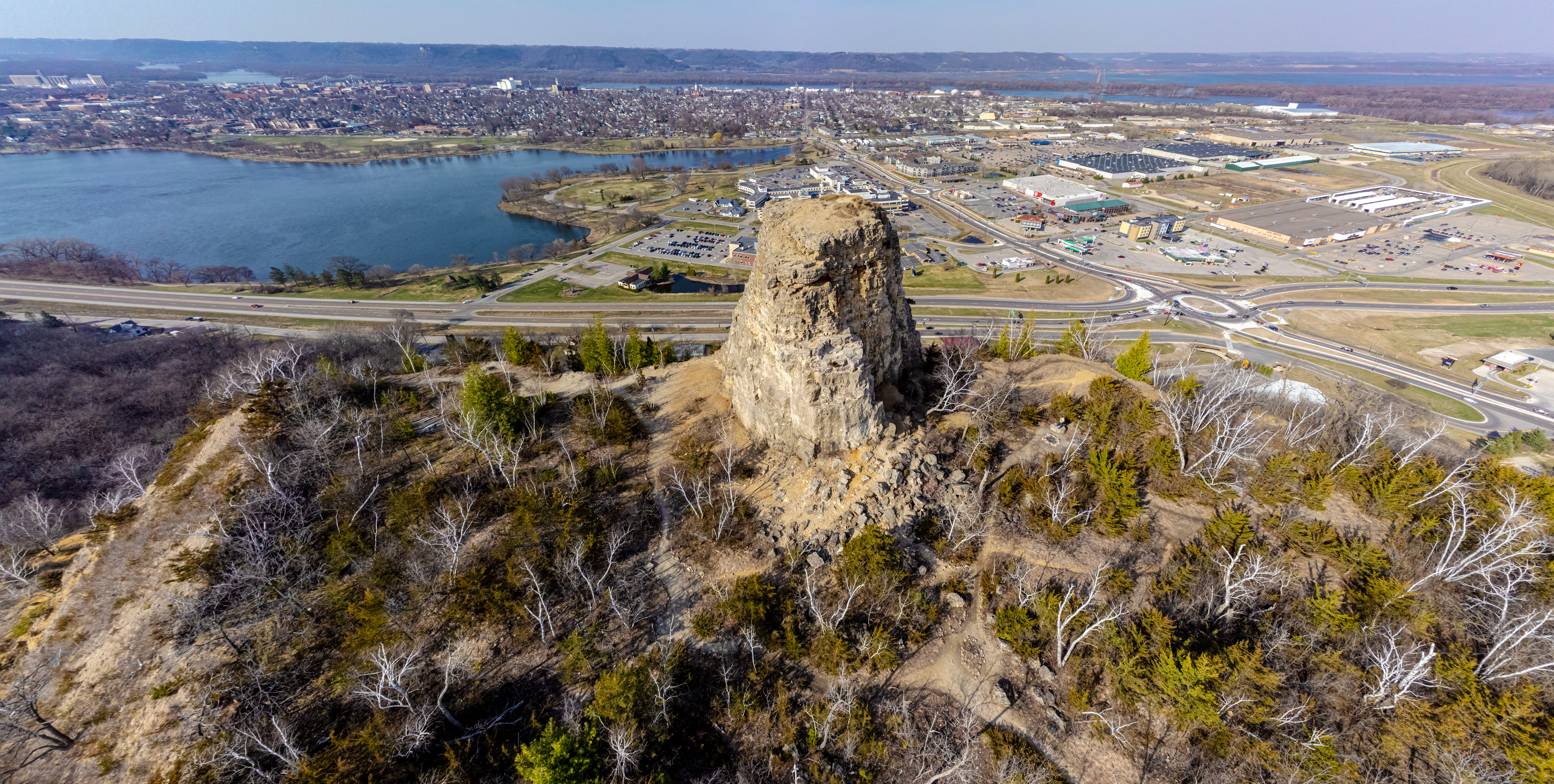
Sugar Loaf in Winona

According to the United States Census Bureau, the city has an area of 24.32 square miles (62.99 km^{2}); 19.03 square miles (49.29 km^{2}) is land and 5.29 square miles (13.70 km^{2}) is water. Lock and Dam 5A spans the Mississippi River in Winona. The highway bridge connecting Winona to the Wisconsin side of the river is at approximately River Mile 726 (USACE map 31).

Winona's primary suburbs are Goodview, Stockton, Minnesota City, and Rollingstone to the west, Homer to the southeast, and Bluff Siding and Fountain City to the north. Rochester is 44 miles west of Winona, La Crescent is 21 miles to the south, and La Crosse is 30 miles to the southeast.

Winona is part of the driftless area, a region never covered by ice during the last ice age, that includes southeastern Minnesota, northeastern Iowa, southwestern Wisconsin and northwestern Illinois.

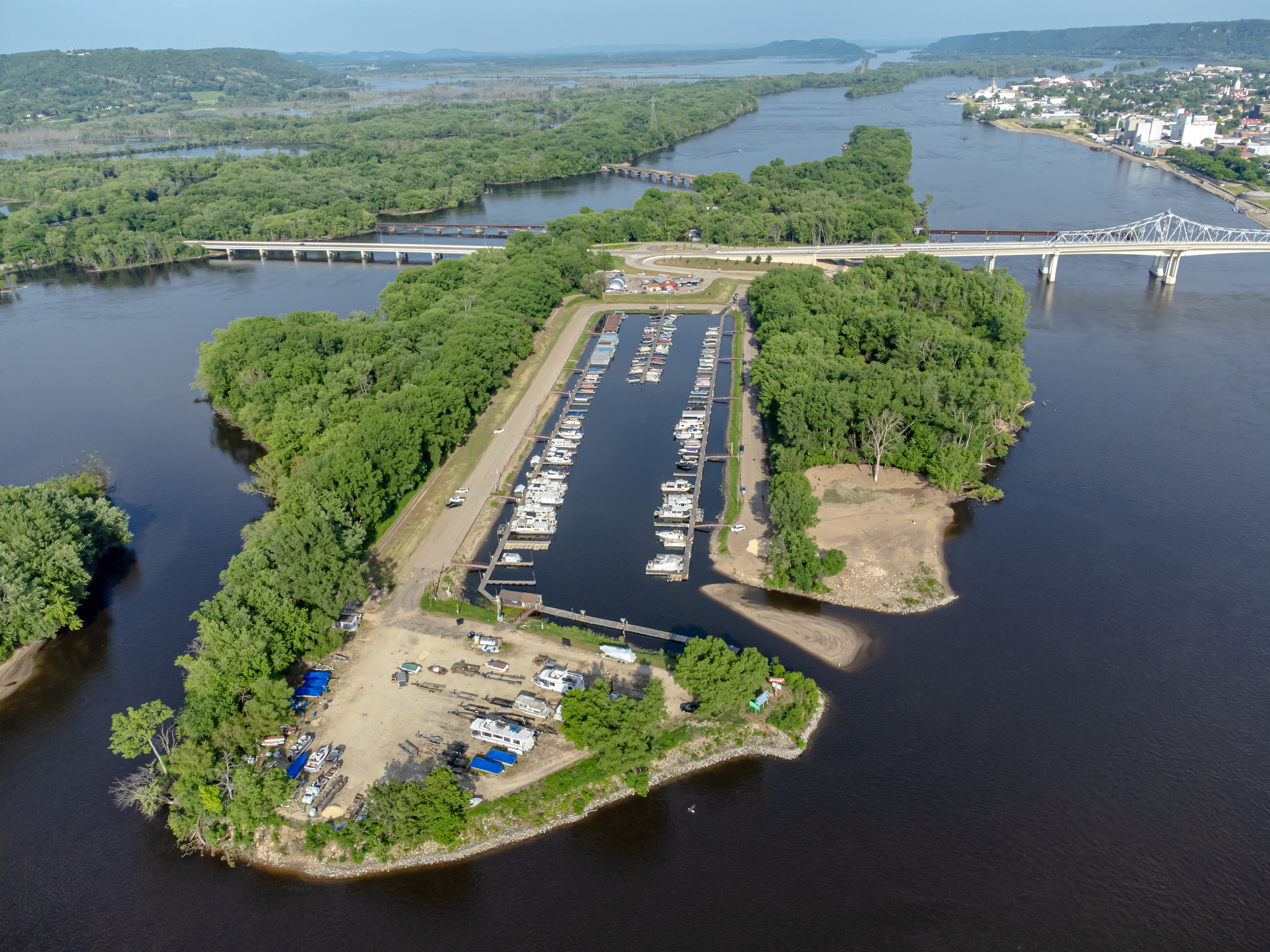
Latsch Island

Just northeast of the city, connected to it by several bridges, is Latsch Island. Officially part of the city since 1998, Latsch Island has been home to a unique community of houseboat ("Boathouse") residents for several decades.

The United States Office of Management and Budget has designated Winona the principal city of the Winona, MN Micropolitan Statistical Area (μSA).

=== Climate ===
Winona's weather station records the warmest climate of any in Minnesota, with a normal year-round average (1971–2000) temperature of 48.9 °F (9.4 °C) compared to 43.2 °F (6.2 °C) in Austin to the city's southwest or 45.4 °F (7.4 °C) in Minneapolis, to the northwest, which experiences a strong urban heat island effect. Temperatures are generally very mild by Minnesota standards; the January mean is 17.6 °F (−8.0 °C), while that of July is 75.8 °F (24.3 °C). Winona has a humid continental climate (Dfa) with hot, humid summers and cold, snowy winters.

Climate data for Winona Dam 5 A, Minnesota (1991–2020 normals, extremes 1893–present)
Month	Jan	Feb	Mar	Apr	May	Jun	Jul	Aug	Sep	Oct	Nov	Dec	Year
Record high °F (°C)	64 (18)	73 (23)	88 (31)	96 (36)	107 (42)	106 (41)	108 (42)	103 (39)	102 (39)	93 (34)	84 (29)	66 (19)	108 (42)
Mean maximum °F (°C)	44.8 (7.1)	50.2 (10.1)	65.8 (18.8)	78.9 (26.1)	86.9 (30.5)	92.4 (33.6)	93.6 (34.2)	92.0 (33.3)	87.9 (31.1)	81.4 (27.4)	64.1 (17.8)	49.9 (9.9)	95.7 (35.4)
Mean daily maximum °F (°C)	25.0 (−3.9)	30.2 (−1.0)	42.3 (5.7)	56.4 (13.6)	68.7 (20.4)	78.4 (25.8)	82.5 (28.1)	80.6 (27.0)	73.2 (22.9)	59.4 (15.2)	43.5 (6.4)	30.7 (−0.7)	55.9 (13.3)
Daily mean °F (°C)	16.5 (−8.6)	20.7 (−6.3)	33.0 (0.6)	46.5 (8.1)	58.4 (14.7)	68.5 (20.3)	72.8 (22.7)	71.0 (21.7)	63.4 (17.4)	50.4 (10.2)	36.3 (2.4)	23.5 (−4.7)	46.7 (8.2)
Mean daily minimum °F (°C)	8.0 (−13.3)	11.1 (−11.6)	23.8 (−4.6)	36.5 (2.5)	48.0 (8.9)	58.6 (14.8)	63.0 (17.2)	61.4 (16.3)	53.6 (12.0)	41.4 (5.2)	29.2 (−1.6)	16.3 (−8.7)	37.6 (3.1)
Mean minimum °F (°C)	−15.3 (−26.3)	−12.1 (−24.5)	1.3 (−17.1)	23.4 (−4.8)	36.0 (2.2)	46.5 (8.1)	54.1 (12.3)	52.3 (11.3)	40.5 (4.7)	27.8 (−2.3)	13.2 (−10.4)	−6.1 (−21.2)	−18.9 (−28.3)
Record low °F (°C)	−35 (−37)	−38 (−39)	−28 (−33)	4 (−16)	21 (−6)	35 (2)	43 (6)	33 (1)	25 (−4)	7 (−14)	−11 (−24)	−31 (−35)	−38 (−39)
Average precipitation inches (mm)	1.06 (27)	1.02 (26)	1.91 (49)	3.65 (93)	4.14 (105)	4.83 (123)	4.11 (104)	4.55 (116)	3.57 (91)	2.53 (64)	1.85 (47)	1.22 (31)	34.44 (875)
Average snowfall inches (cm)	9.8 (25)	9.3 (24)	5.7 (14)	1.6 (4.1)	0.2 (0.51)	0.0 (0.0)	0.0 (0.0)	0.0 (0.0)	0.0 (0.0)	0.1 (0.25)	1.4 (3.6)	9.5 (24)	37.6 (96)
Average extreme snow depth inches (cm)	9.6 (24)	11.4 (29)	7.7 (20)	1.1 (2.8)	0.2 (0.51)	0.0 (0.0)	0.0 (0.0)	0.0 (0.0)	0.0 (0.0)	0.0 (0.0)	1.0 (2.5)	7.1 (18)	14.1 (36)
Average precipitation days (≥ 0.01 in)	8.6	7.6	9.0	11.8	13.0	12.2	10.1	9.4	9.5	9.6	7.5	9.0	117.3
Average snowy days (≥ 0.1 in)	5.3	4.4	2.3	0.7	0.0	0.0	0.0	0.0	0.0	0.1	1.1	4.7	18.6
Source: NOAA

== Demographics ==
Historical population
Census	Pop.	Note	%±
1860	2,464		—
1870	7,192		191.9%
1880	10,208		41.9%
1890	18,208		78.4%
1900	19,714		8.3%
1910	18,583		−5.7%
1920	19,143		3.0%
1930	20,850		8.9%
1940	22,490		7.9%
1950	25,031		11.3%
1960	24,895		−0.5%
1970	26,438		6.2%
1980	25,075		−5.2%
1990	25,399		1.3%
2000	27,069		6.6%
2010	27,592		1.9%
2020	25,948		−6.0%
2022 (est.)	25,842		−0.4%
U.S. Decennial Census; 2020 Census

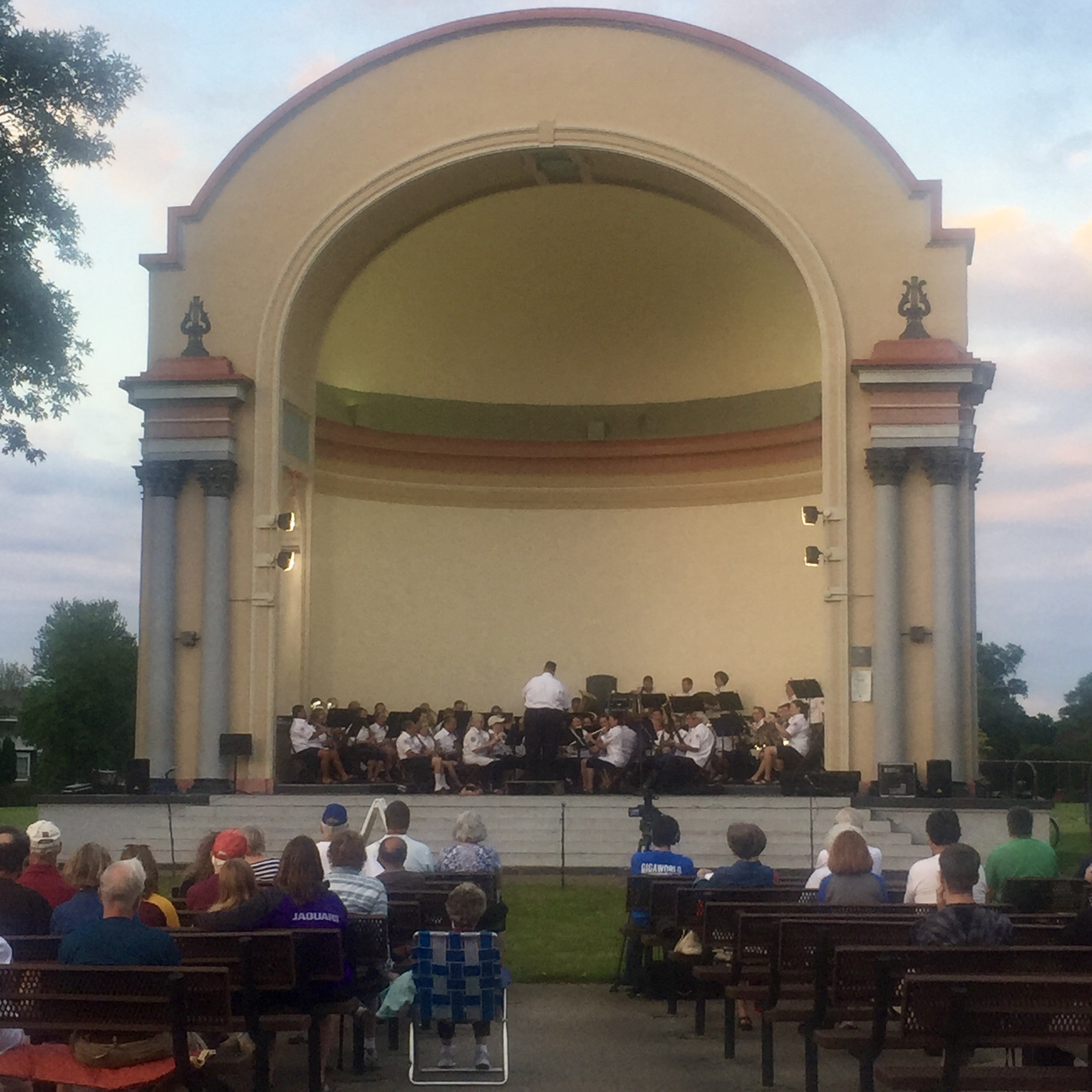
Winona Lake Park Bandshell

=== 2020 census ===
As of the 2020 census, Winona had a population of 25,948 and a population density of 1,363.5 inhabitants per square mile (526.5/km^{2}). Of residents, 94.4% lived in urban areas and 5.6% lived in rural areas.

The median age was 31.6 years. 14.7% of residents were under the age of 18 and 18.0% were 65 years of age or older. For every 100 females there were 88.3 males, and for every 100 females age 18 and over there were 85.2 males age 18 and over.

There were 10,631 households in the city. Of all households, 18.9% had children under the age of 18 living in them, 34.2% were married-couple households, 25.1% were households with a male householder and no spouse or partner present, and 32.2% were households with a female householder and no spouse or partner present. About 39.2% of all households were made up of individuals and 14.8% had someone living alone who was 65 years of age or older.

There were 11,525 housing units, at an average density of 605.6 per square mile (233.8/km^{2}); 7.8% were vacant. The homeowner vacancy rate was 1.1% and the rental vacancy rate was 8.2%.

Racial composition as of the 2020 census
Race	Number	Percent
White	23,171	89.3%
Black or African American	718	2.8%
American Indian and Alaska Native	69	0.3%
Asian	573	2.2%
Native Hawaiian and Other Pacific Islander	0	0.0%
Some other race	325	1.3%
Two or more races	1,092	4.2%
Hispanic or Latino (of any race)	829	3.2%

=== 2010 census ===
As of the census of 2010, there were 27,592 people, 10,449 households, and 5,022 families residing in the city. The population density was 1,464.5 inhabitants per square mile (565.4/km^{2}). There were 10,989 housing units at an average density of 583.3 per square mile (225.2/km^{2}). The racial makeup of the city was 93.0% White, 1.9% African American, 0.3% Native American, 2.9% Asian, 0.5% from other races, and 1.3% from two or more races. Hispanic or Latino of any race were 1.7% of the population.

There were 10,449 households, of which 20.7% had children under the age of 18 living with them, 36.4% were married couples living together, 8.5% had a female householder with no husband present, 3.2% had a male householder with no wife present, and 51.9% were non-families. 35.6% of all households were made up of individuals, and 12.6% had someone living alone who was 65 years of age or older. The average household size was 2.24 and the average family size was 2.84.

The median age in the city was 26.7 years. 14.4% of residents were under the age of 18; 33.2% were between the ages of 18 and 24; 18.5% were from 25 to 44; 20.5% were from 45 to 64; and 13.3% were 65 years of age or older. The gender makeup of the city was 47.3% male and 52.7% female.

=== 2000 census ===
As of the census of 2000, there were 27,069 residents. The population density was 1,485.0 inhabitants per square mile (573.4/km^{2}). There were 10,666 housing units at an average density of 585.1 per square mile (225.9/km^{2}). The racial makeup of the city was 94.47% White, 1.13% African American, 0.23% Native American, 2.65% Asian, 0.01% Pacific Islander, 0.47% from other races, and 1.03% from two or more races. Hispanic or Latino of any race were 1.35% of the population.

Ancestries: German (43.2%), Norwegian (15.5%), Polish (14.8%), Irish (13.0%), English (5.5%), French (3.6%).

There were 10,301 households, out of which 23.9% had children under the age of 18 living with them, 40.4% were married couples living together, 8.4% had a female householder with no husband present, and 48.3% were non-families. 35.2% of all households were made up of individuals, and 12.8% had someone living alone who was 65 years of age or older. The average household size was 2.27 and the average family size was 2.94.

In the city, the population was spread out, with 18.0% under the age of 18, 27.5% from 18 to 24, 22.2% from 25 to 44, 18.0% from 45 to 64, and 14.2% who were 65 years of age or older. The median age was 29 years. For every 100 females, there were 88.7 males. For every 100 females age 18 and over, there were 85.1 males.

The median income for a household was $32,845, and the median income for a family was $48,413. Males had a median income of $31,047 versus $23,302 for females. The per capita income was $16,783. About 6.5% of families and 17.3% of the population were below the poverty line, including 11.5% of those under age 18 and 10.7% of those age 65 or over.

== Economy ==
Winona is home to the headquarters to many companies, including Fastenal, Thern Inc., Knitcraft Corporation, RTP Company, We-No-Nah Canoe, United Building Centers, Badger Equipment Company, Winona Lighting, Hal Leonard Music, WinCraft Sports, and Winona Pattern & Mold. Bay State Milling operates a grain processing facility in Winona and was founded there in 1899.

Watkins Incorporated, a manufacturer of health remedies, baking products, and household goods, was founded in 1868 by J. R. Watkins in Plainview, Minnesota. The company relocated to Winona in 1885. By the early 20th century, J. R. Watkins had become one of the largest direct-sales companies in the United States. The company headquarters, a complex of seven buildings, is listed on the National Register of Historic Places.

Winona is also known as the stained glass capital of the United States. Willet Hauser Architectural Glass is a stained glass firm in Winona that specializes in the design, fabrication, preservation and restoration of leaded stained glass and faceted glass windows. The studio is one of the oldest in North America.

Fastenal, headquartered in Winona, ranked 479th in the 2021 Fortune 500 based on its 2020 revenues. In 2023 Fastenal fell to number 514. Its stock is a component of the Nasdaq 100 index.

=== Top employers ===
According to the City's 2022 Comprehensive Annual Financial Report, its largest employers are:

#	Employer	Type of Business	# of Employees	Percentage
1	Fastenal Company	Commercial/Industrial	1,618	5.00%
2	Winona State University	Post-secondary education	1,050	4.19%
3	Winona Health	Hospital/Clinic/Health Care	975	3.59%
4	Winona Area Public Schools ISD 861	K-12 education	684	2.20%
5	WinCraft	Promotional materials	500	1.75%
6	Saint Mary's University of Minnesota	Post-secondary education	450	1.57%
7	TRW Automotive Electronics	Industrial machinery	400	1.40%
8	RTP Company	Industrial	375	1.31%
9	County of Winona	County Government	300	1.05%
10	Watlow Electric Manufacturing Company	Electronic Control manufacturer	289	1.01%
—	Total principal employers	—	6,606	23.07%
—	Other employers	—	22,019	76.93%
—	Total employers	—	28,625	100.00%

== Arts and culture ==
=== Architecture ===
In addition to the two NRHP historic districts, Winona has multiple buildings of architectural significance

- Choate Department Store
- Merchants National Bank Building
- Watkins Incorporated Building
- Winona Savings Bank Building
- Winona Commercial Historic District
- East Second Street Commercial Historic District

=== Culture ===
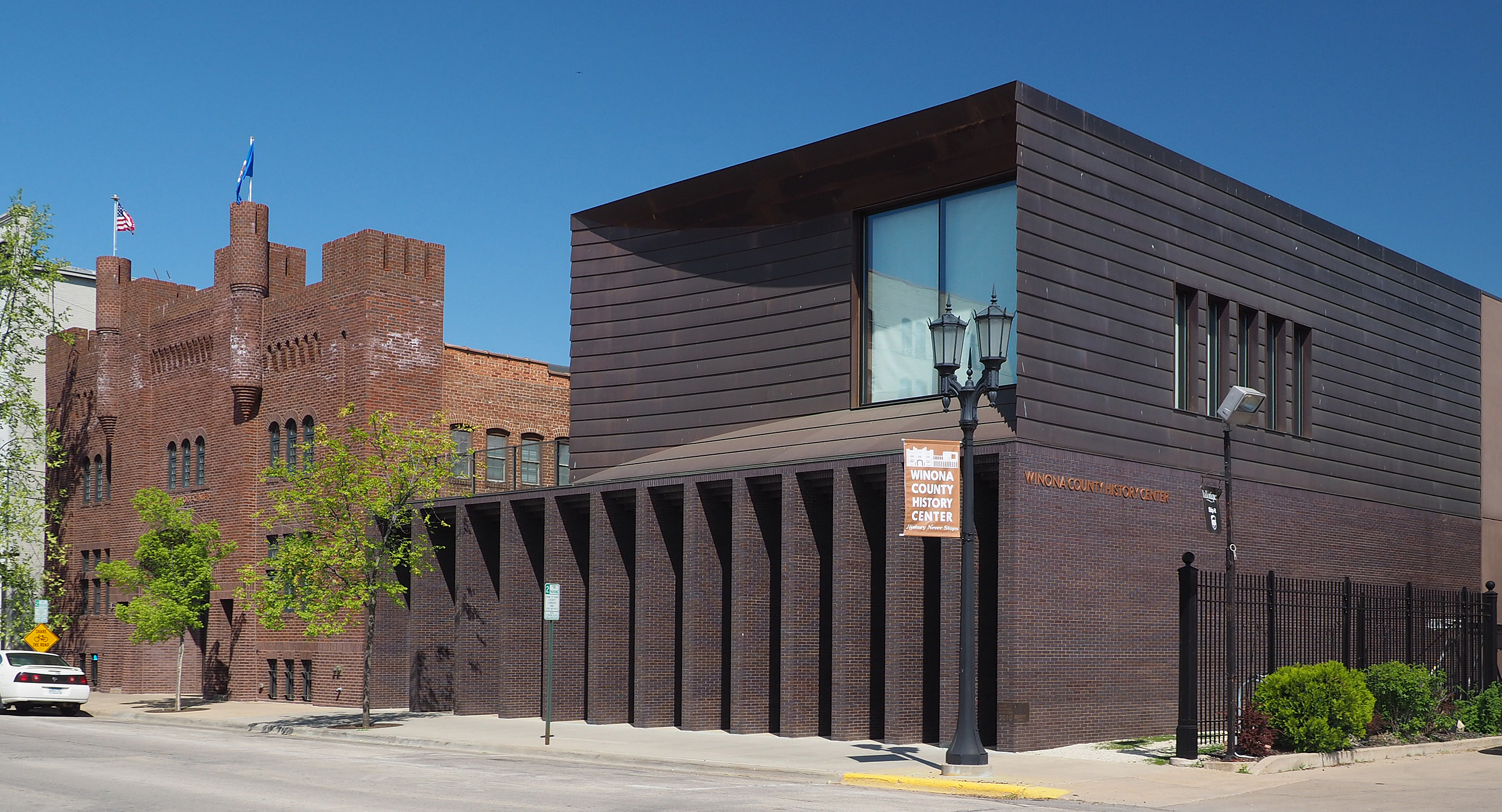
Winona County History Center

The city offers artistic venues and historical experiences. The city earned the nickname "Stained Glass Capital of the United States" for its stunning religious and secular stained glass pieces. The Great River Shakespeare Festival stages professional productions of Shakespeare's plays each summer, while the Minnesota Conservatory for the Arts provides a full spectrum of artistic training and performances. The River Arts Alliance organizes educational programs, community events, and public art projects while fostering a collaborative artist community. Projects include poetry etched into sidewalks on the Winona Poetry Walk. The Winona County History Center, made up of two buildings, the historic Winona Armory and the modern Laird Norton Addition, offers exhibits in its museum and art gallery, and exploration of the region's history in their Laird Lucas Library and Archives.

=== Landmarks ===
- Sugar Loaf is a river bluff topped by a distinctive rock pinnacle, which was left after quarrying activity in the 19th century. It is at the junction of Highway 61 and Highway 43/Mankato Avenue.
- Basilica of Saint Stanislaus Kostka is a historic Catholic church built in 1895 in the Polish Cathedral Style.
- Lake Winona is separated from the Mississippi River by downtown Winona. It is surrounded by a park, which contains the Winona Lake Park Bandshell and a recreation center.
- Garvin Heights City Park is an overlook of the Mississippi River that is used to view a panorama of the city and surrounding area.
- Merchants National Bank by Purcell and Elmslie is a bank building designed in the Prairie School architectural style. It was built in 1912 and features elaborate terracotta and stained-glass ornamentation.

== Government ==
Winona is in Minnesota's 1st congressional district, represented by Brad Finstad, a Republican. At the state level, Winona is in Senate District 28, represented by Republican Jeremy Miller, and in House District 26A, represented by Republican Aaron Repinski. Nearby House District 28B is represented by Greg Davids, a Republican. Scott Sherman is the mayor.

Presidential election results

Presidential election results2016 Precinct Results Spreadsheet2012 Precinct Results Spreadsheet2008 Precinct Results Spreadsheet2004 Precinct Results Spreadsheet2000 Precinct Results Spreadsheet
Year	Republican	Democratic	Third parties
2020	37.4% 5,040	60.0% 8,077	2.6% 354
2016	37.6% 5,188	51.6% 7,120	10.8% 1,489
2012	36.5% 5,455	60.4% 9,015	3.1% 467
2008	34.2% 5,223	63.7% 9,738	2.1% 328
2004	41.0% 6,074	57.1% 8,448	1.9% 281
2000	39.7% 5,186	49.5% 6,465	10.8% 1,418

== Education ==
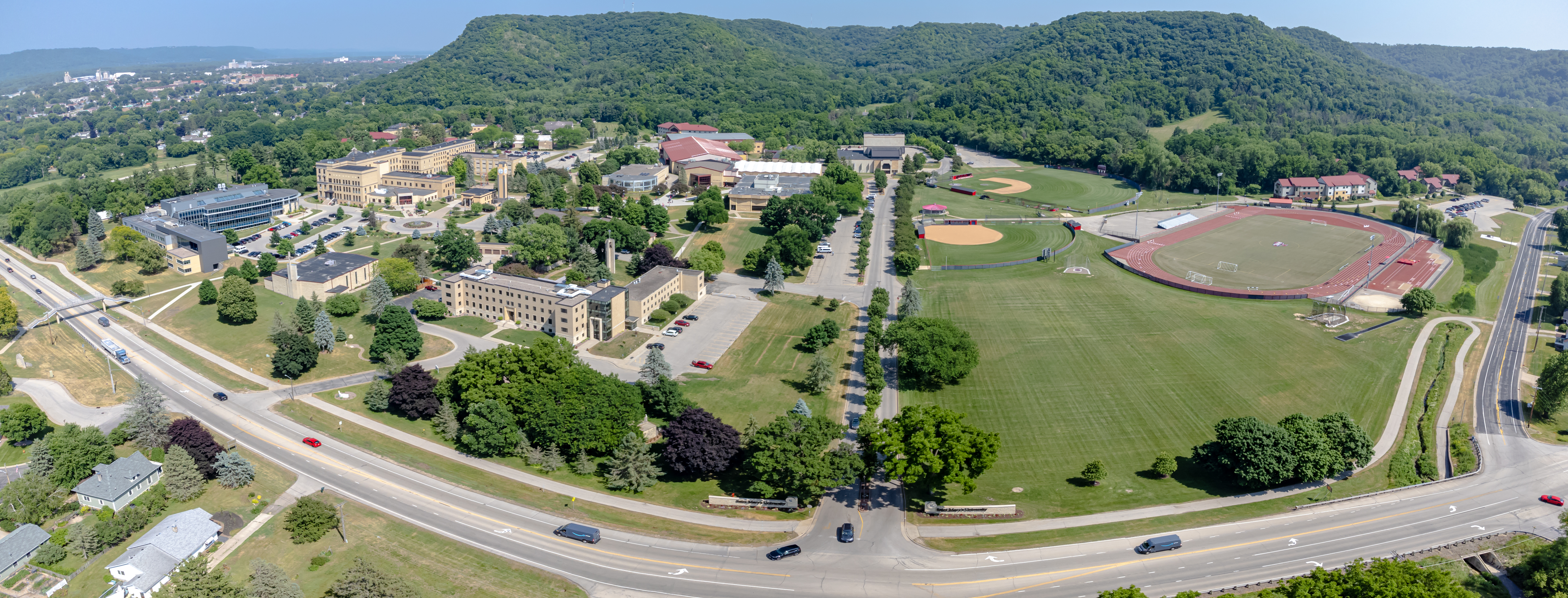
St. Mary's University of Winona

Winona became the site of the first normal school west of the Mississippi in 1858 with the establishment of Winona Normal School (now Winona State University). This was the beginning of Winona's tradition as a center of higher education. In 2018-2019, Winona State University (WSU) had approximately 7,200 undergraduate students and 560 graduate students. WSU is part of the Minnstate system.

Saint Mary's College (now Saint Mary's University of Minnesota) was founded as a private Catholic, Lasallian school in 1912. Later, as the necessity of higher education for women became apparent, the College of Saint Teresa was created. After Saint Mary's became co-ed in 1969, Saint Teresa closed in 1988, and its facilities are now used, owned, and/or operated by Saint Mary's, Winona State, and Cotter High School. Minnesota State College-Southeast also has a campus in Winona.

There are various K-12 educational opportunities. Run by Winona Area Public Schools, the local public school system includes five elementary schools (three in Winona), Winona Middle School, and Winona Senior High School. The Winona Area Catholic Schools system includes St. Nicholas Hall Primary School, St. Luke Elementary School, Cotter Junior High School, and Cotter Senior High School. St. Martin's School, St. Matthew's School, and Hope Lutheran High School are private Lutheran schools in Winona. Two charter schools, Winona Riverway Learning Community (PreK-12) l, and Bluffview Montessori Charter School (K-8) are in the city. Bluffview is notable as the United States' first charter Montessori school and second charter school overall.

Main Square Montessori (MSM) is a nonprofit Montessori learning center for children from 16 months to six years old in a partnership between the Hiawatha Education Foundation and Cotter Schools.

Several organizations also provide community education. The Minnesota Conservatory for the Arts offers community classes for early childhood through 55+ adult programs in the areas of dance, music, theater, and visual arts. Winona Area Public Schools, Winona State University, The City of Winona Parks and Recreation, and Winona Arts Center offer additional community learning opportunities.

== Media ==
=== Print ===
Winona has two newspapers: the Winona Daily News, a daily morning paper; and the Winona Post, a weekly paper with a Wednesday edition.

=== Television ===
Winona receives TV signals from neighboring cities, including several channels each from La Crosse, Rochester, Eau Claire, and the Twin Cities, although what can be received depends on the location within the area, as the extensive system of valleys and ridges may block any or all signals. There is one local public broadcasting TV network, HBCI, which is available only to subscribers of the HBC cable company.

=== Radio ===
==== FM ====
FM radio stations
Frequency	Call sign	Name	Format	Owner
88.5 FM	K203BR (KFSI Translator)		Christian	Faith Sound Incorporated
89.5 FM	KQAL		College	Winona State University
92.5 FM	KSMR		Christian	Real Presence Radio
94.3 FM	K232CZ (KSMR Translator)		Christian	Real Presence Radio
95.3 FM	KGSL	KG-95.3	Hot AC	Leighton Broadcasting
98.7 FM	W274BW (KWNO-AM Translator)		News/Talk	Leighton Broadcasting
99.3 FM	KWMN	The Fan Winona	Sports	Leighton Broadcasting
101.1 FM	KRIV	101.1 The River	Classic Hits	Leighton Broadcasting
101.9 FM	K270AB (KZSE Translator)	MPR News	Public Radio	Minnesota Public Radio
103.9 FM	K280EL (KQYB Translator)	KQ98	Country	Family Radio, Inc.
107.3 FM	W297AW (KLSE Translator)	Classical MPR	Classical	Minnesota Public Radio

==== AM ====
AM radio stations
Frequency	Call sign	Name	Format	Owner
1230 AM	KWNO		News/Talk	Leighton Broadcasting
1380 AM	KHWK		Country	Leighton Broadcasting

== Infrastructure ==
=== Transportation ===
U.S. Highway 14, U.S. Highway 61, Minnesota Highway 43 and Wisconsin State Highway 54 are the main routes into the city. Interstate Highway 90 is a short distance south of the city.

Winona was once served by four railroads; Milwaukee Road, Chicago & North Western, Chicago Great Western and Green Bay & Western, with the Burlington Route trains stopping at a station across the river in Wisconsin. Only the former Milwaukee Road station remains and is now served by Amtrak's Empire Builder daily in each direction between Chicago and Seattle and Portland, as well as the daily Borealis running between Saint Paul, Minnesota and Chicago. The Milwaukee Road is now owned by Canadian Pacific, as is the Dakota, Minnesota & Eastern, which operates the former Chicago & North Western line from Winona to the west.

The Winona Transit Service provides public bus transportation six days per week. The city is also along the Mississippi River Trail, and the Flyway Trail connects the city to nearby trail systems in Wisconsin. Winona Municipal Airport - Max Conrad Field serves general aviation in the area. It was served by a passenger airliner, Mississippi Valley Airlines, until the mid-1970s.

== Notable people ==
- Carol Bartz, former CEO of Yahoo!, formerly of Autodesk
- Charles H. Berry, first Attorney General of Minnesota
- Bernhard Brenner, founder/president of Knitcraft Corporation, manufacturer of St. Croix luxury knitwear
- Paul Breza, Roman Catholic priest and founder of Winona's Polish Cultural Institute and Museum
- Robert Henry Brom, Roman Catholic bishop
- Alec Brown, NBA player
- Frank Bures, writer
- Roger Busdicker, co-founder of Hal Leonard Corporation
- Jan Romuald Byzewski OFM, pastor of Saint Stanislaus Kostka Parish and founder of the Polish-language newspaper Wiarus
- Tracy Caulkins, swimmer, three-time Olympic gold medalist
- Max Conrad, aviator
- James Earle Fraser (1876–1953), sculptor, designer of the Buffalo nickel and the "End of the Trail" statue
- Paul Giel, athlete, two-time Big Ten Player of the Year, member of College Football Hall of Fame
- Mabel Farrington Gifford, expert on speech defects and disorders
- Elliott Heath, distance runner
- Garrett Heath, distance runner
- James "J. R." Keller, state senator and representative
- Bob Kierlin, businessman and politician
- Alphonse Roy Lejk, politician
- John G. McMynn, Wisconsin Superintendent of Public Instruction
- William D. Mitchell, United States Attorney General under presidents Calvin Coolidge and Herbert Hoover
- Thomas H. Moodie, North Dakota governor
- Anne Pellowski, author, educator, and Kashubian American activist
- Benjamin H. Randall, American politician and businessman, early settler to Minnesota Territory
- Winona Ryder, actress, born in Winona and named after the city
- Corey Schell, American professional bowhunter and archer
- Charles Peter Schuler, Minnesota state legislator and businessman
- Orlando Stevens, member of the state legislatures of Vermont and Minnesota
- Tom Stoa, Minnesota state legislator and beekeeper
- Eleanor Joy Toll, Los Angeles-area educator and clubwoman
- Joseph Ray Watkins, entrepreneur and founder of Watkins Incorporated
- Julie Wera, infielder with 1927 New York Yankees
- Eugenia Wheeler Goff (1844-1922), historian, cartographer, educator, and author
- William Windom (1827–1891), member of both the U.S. House of Representatives and U.S. Senate from Minnesota; later Secretary of the Treasury
- Cat Zingano, mixed martial artist

== Sister cities ==
- Bytów, Pomeranian Voivodeship, Poland
- Misato, Miyagi, Japan

== Gallery ==
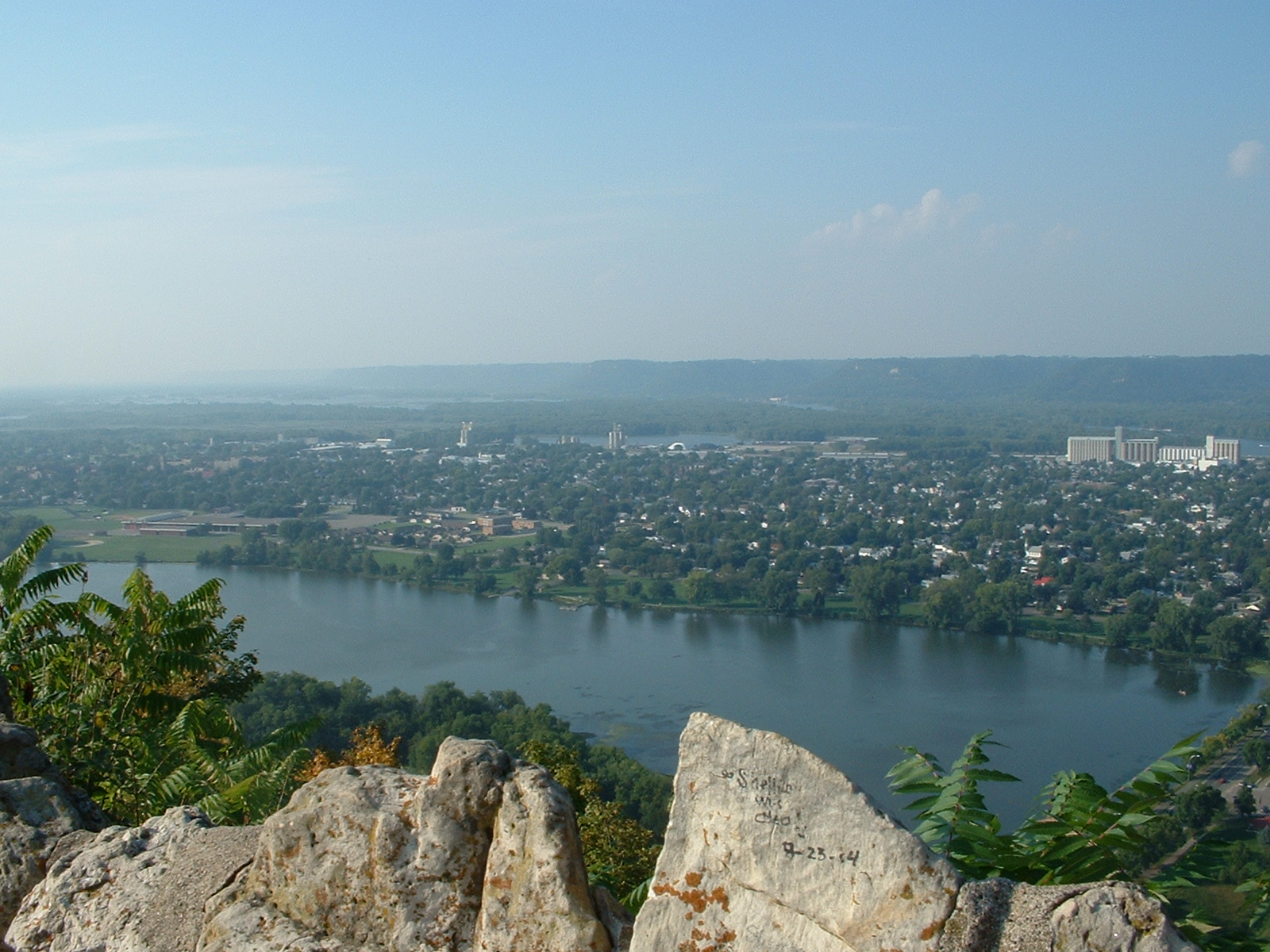
View of city and Mississippi River from bluff top.

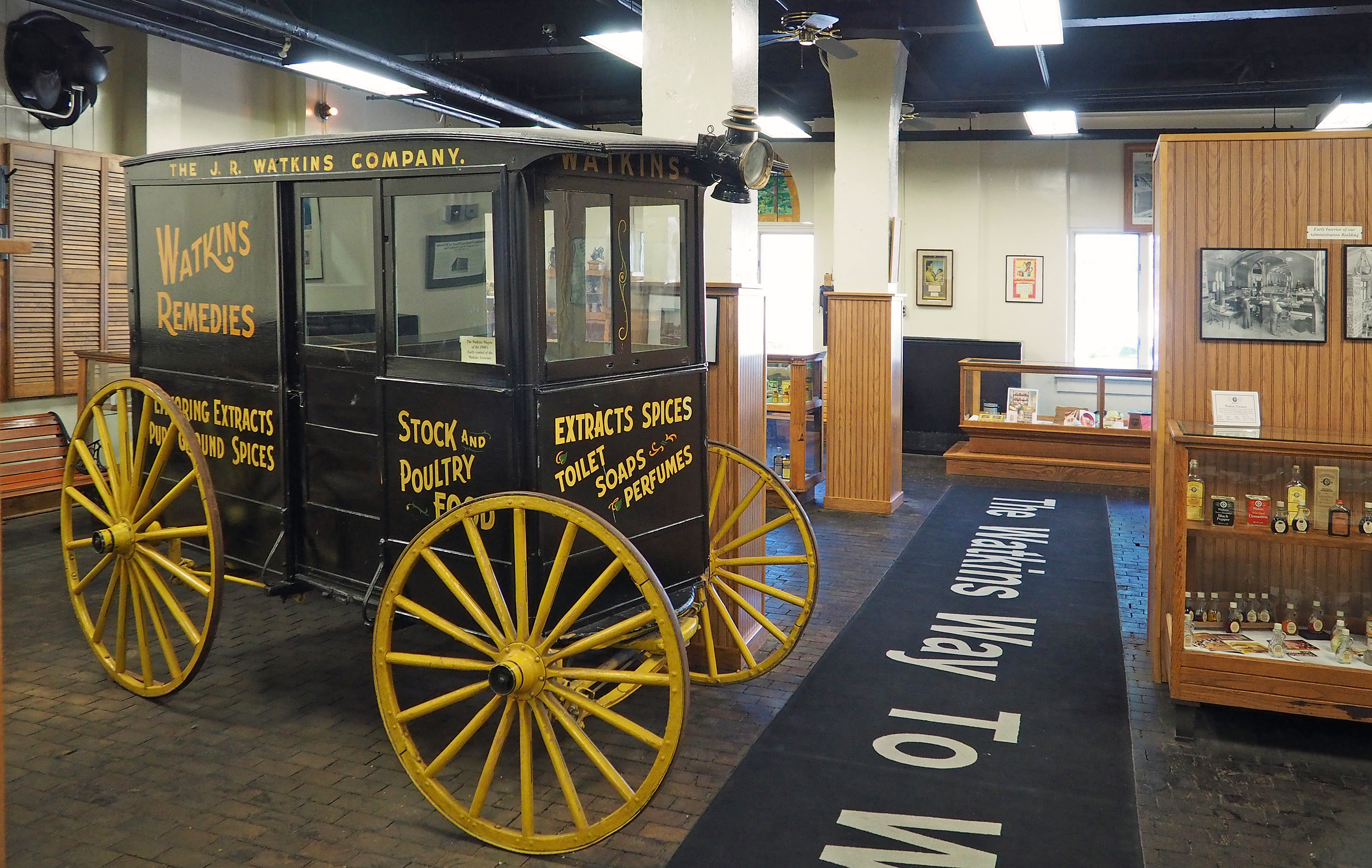
Watkins Museum

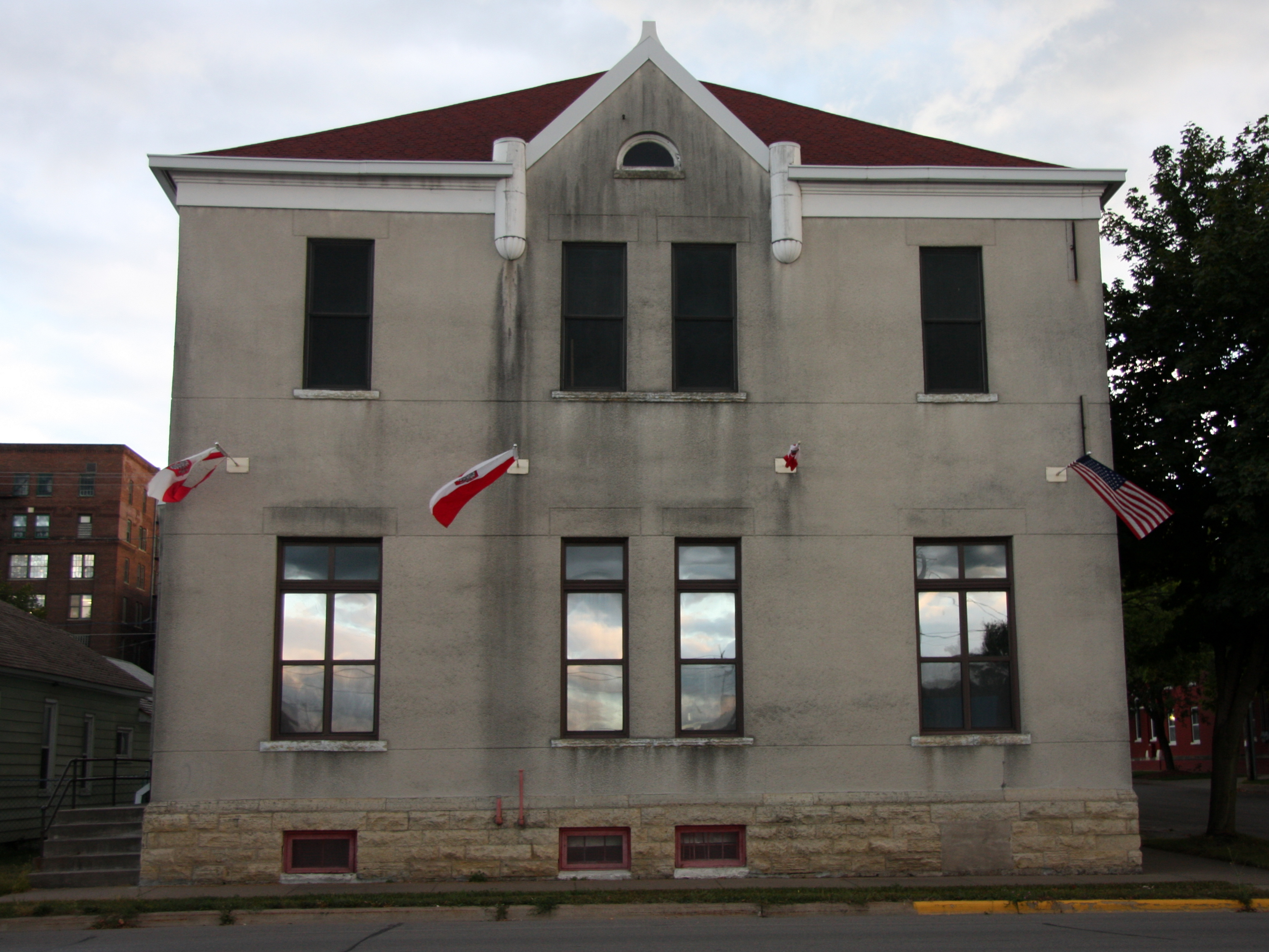
Polish Cultural Institute and Museum

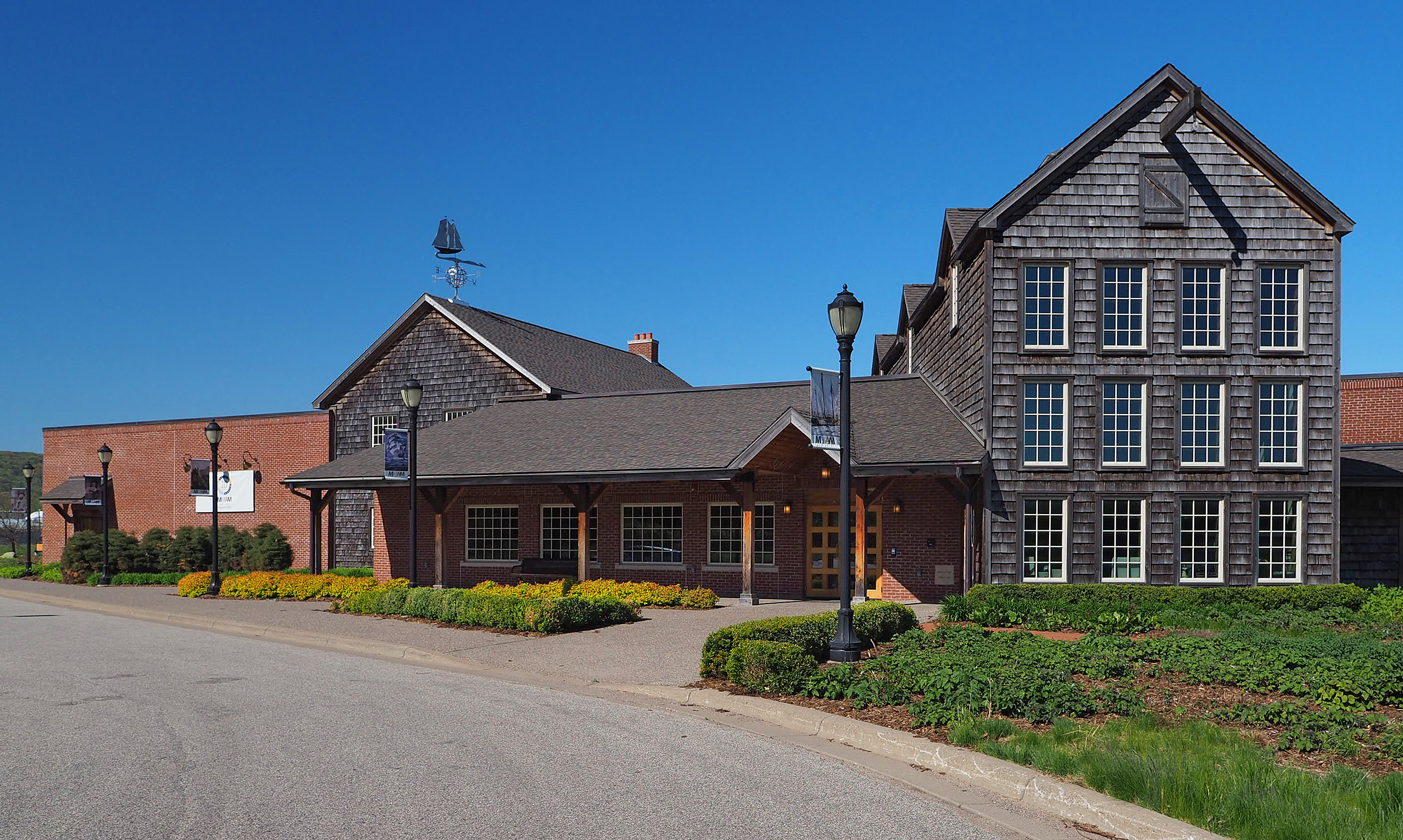
Minnesota Marine Art Museum

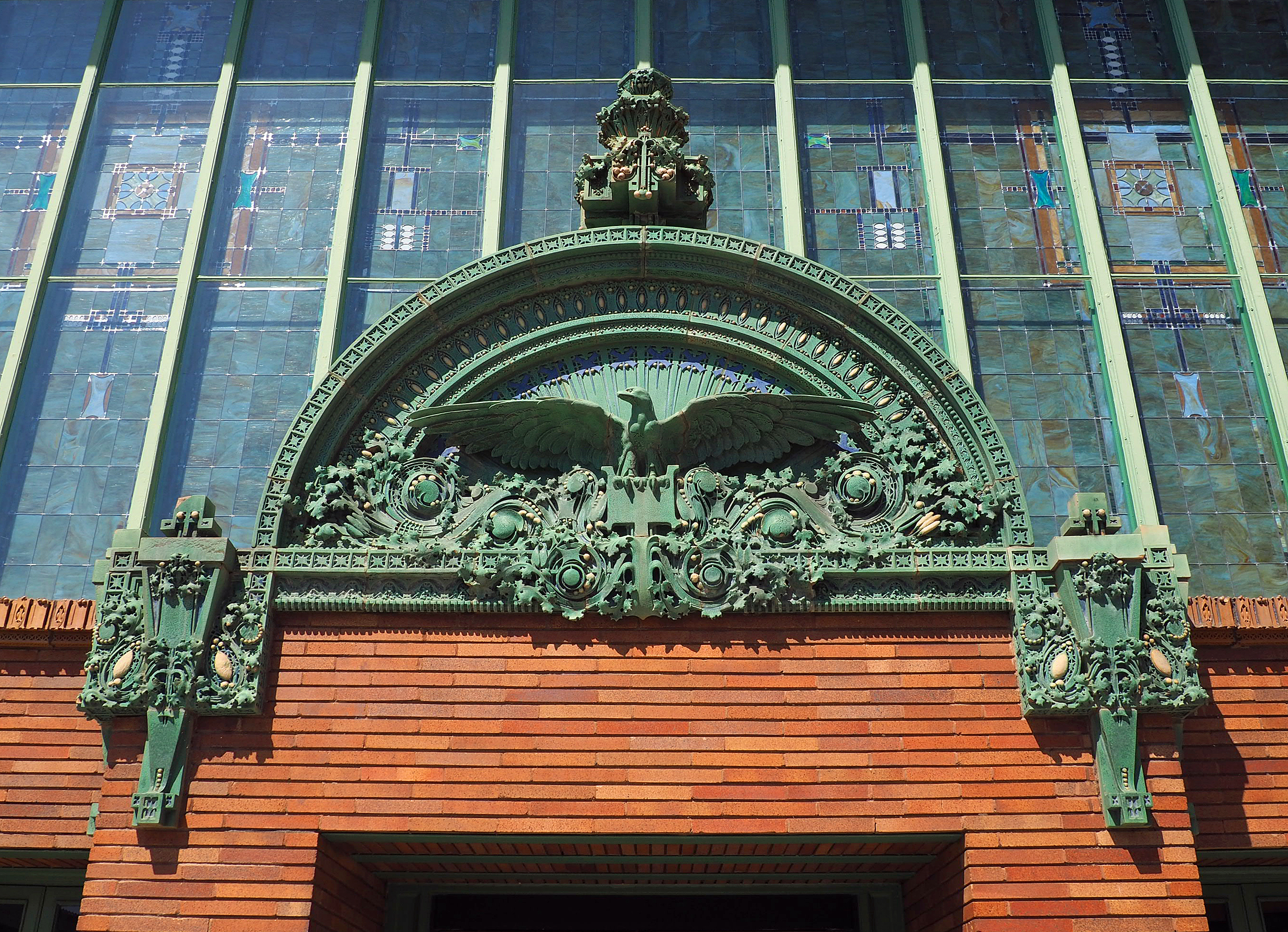
Merchants National Bank entry

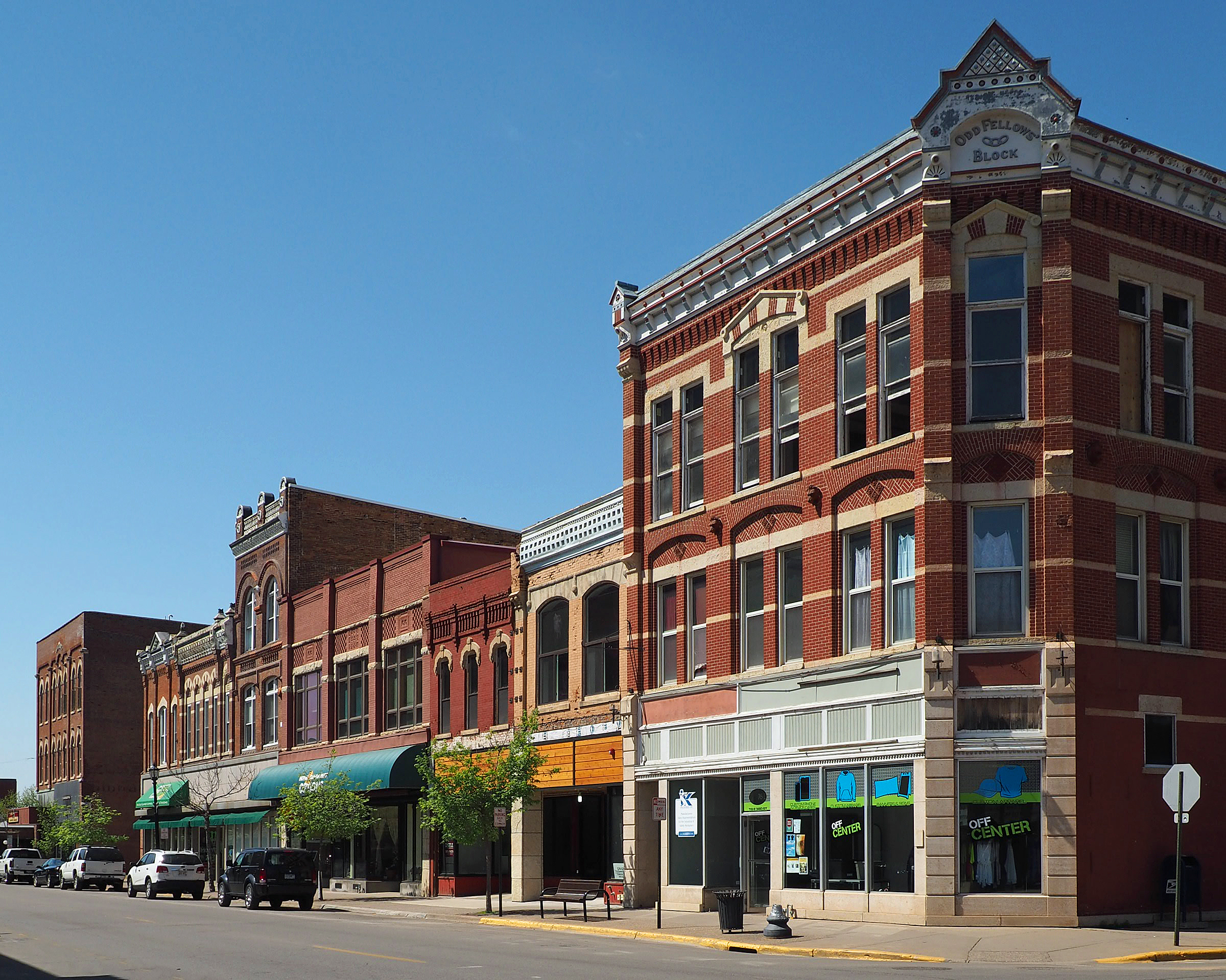
Winona Commercial Historic District

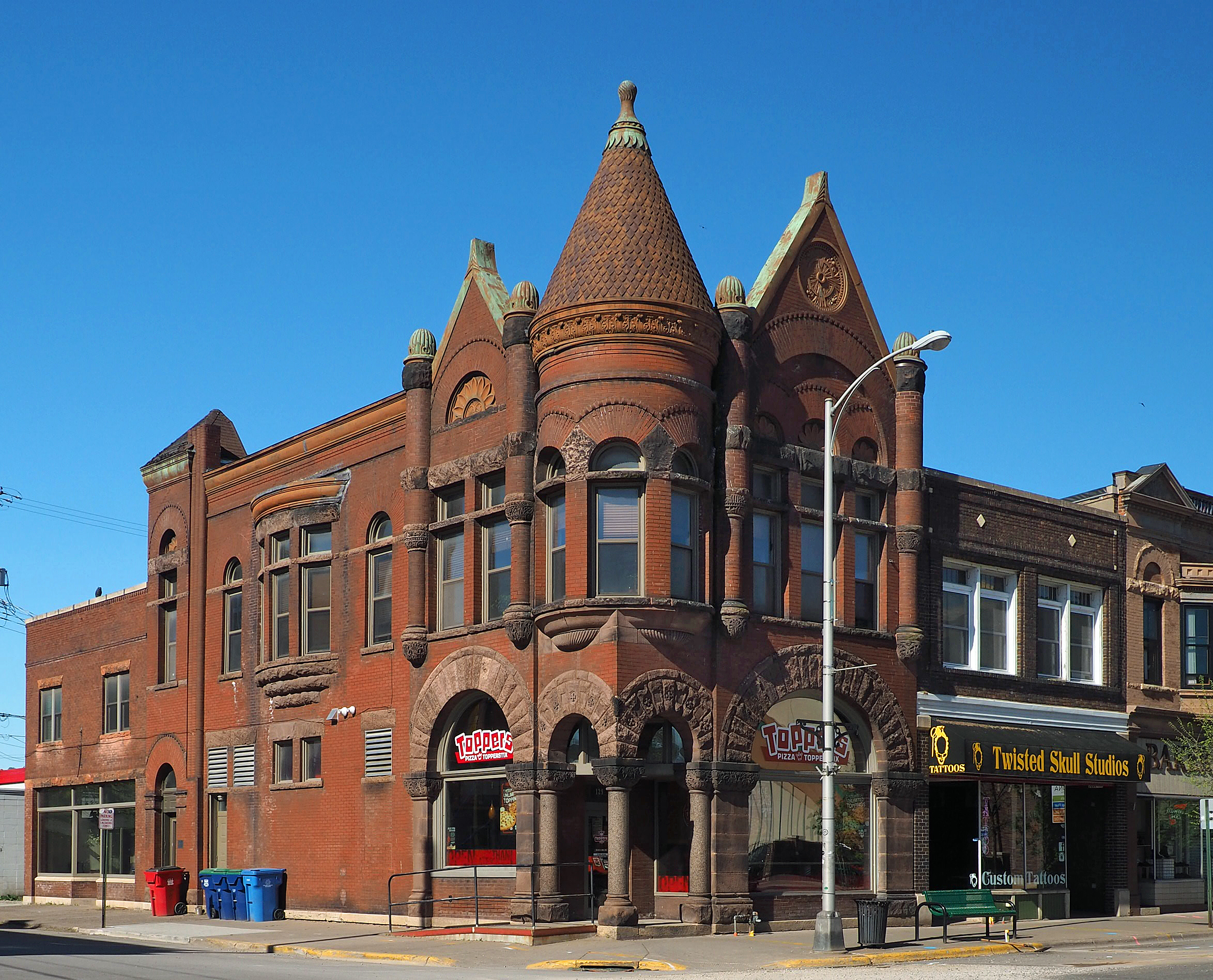
Historic German-American Bank building

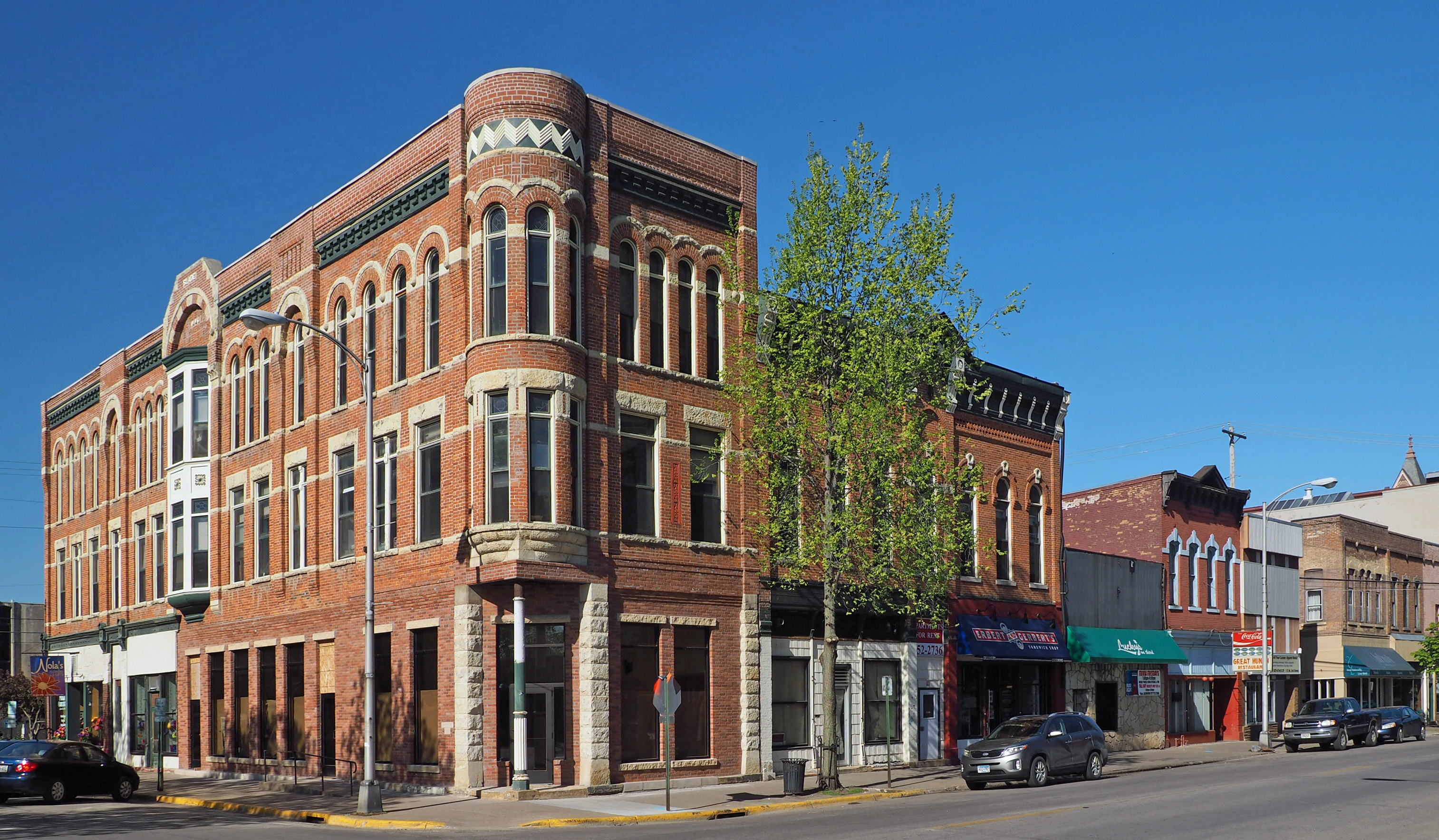
Winona Commercial Historic District

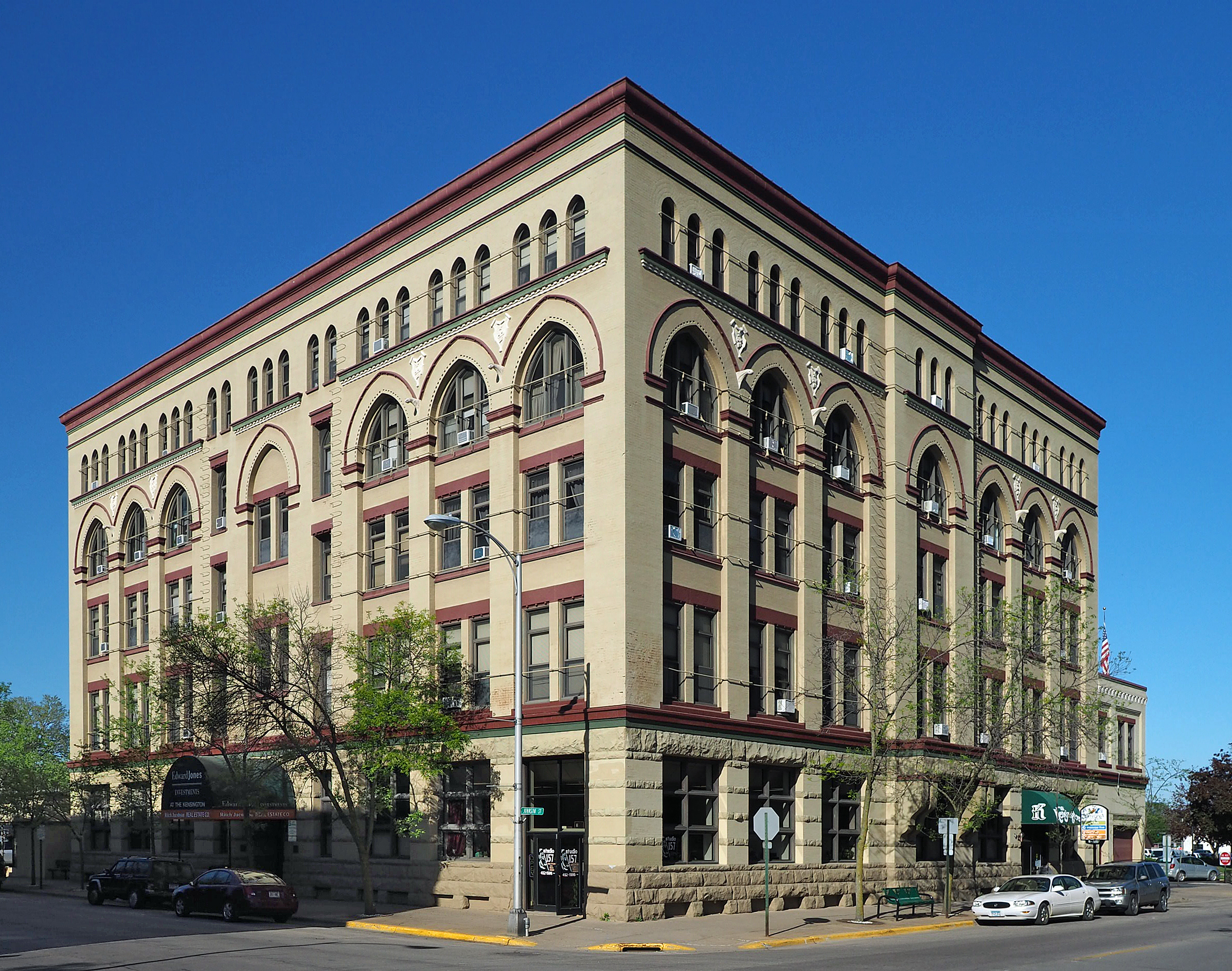
Historic Winona Hotel building

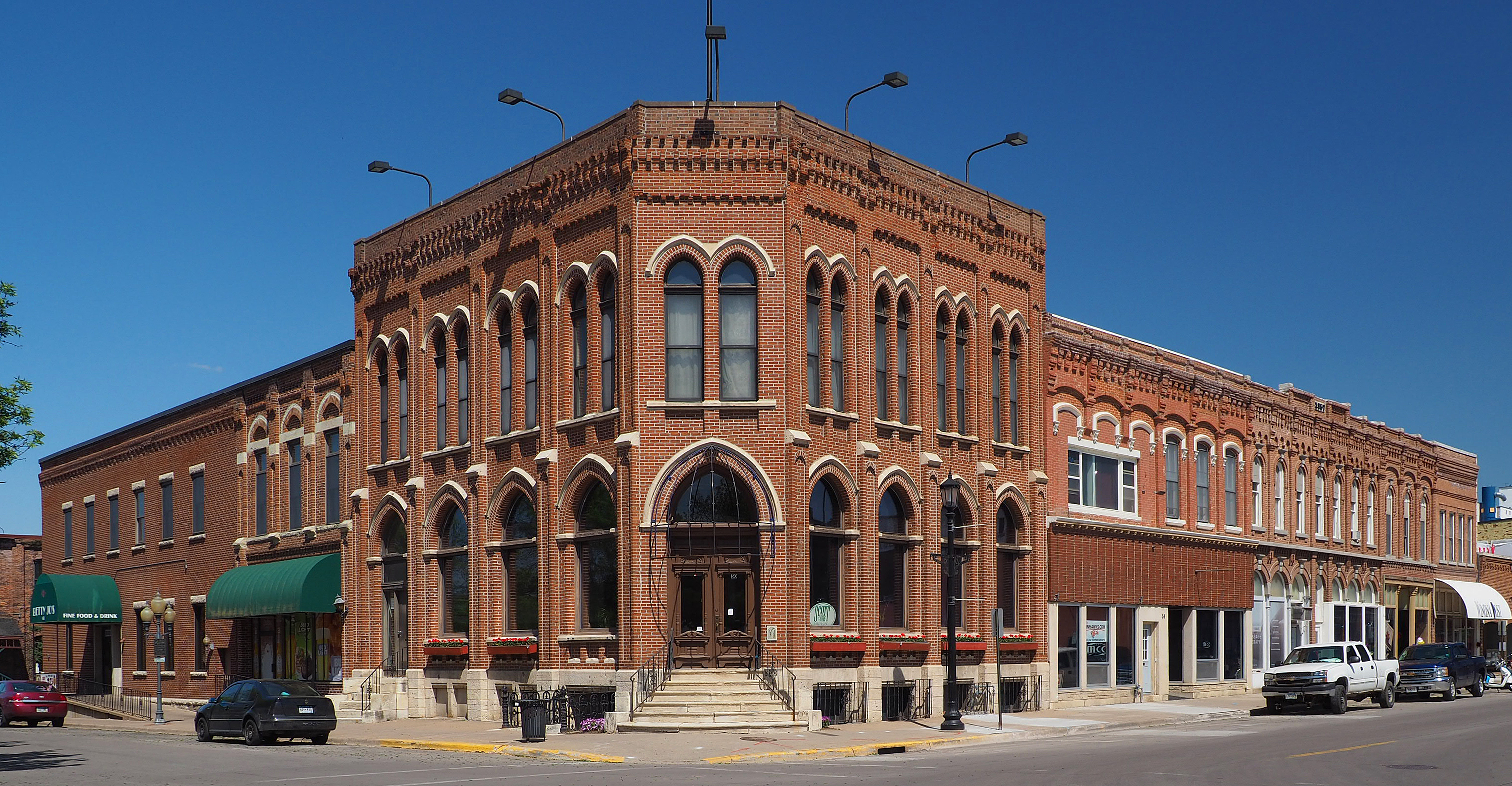
East Second Street Commercial Historic District

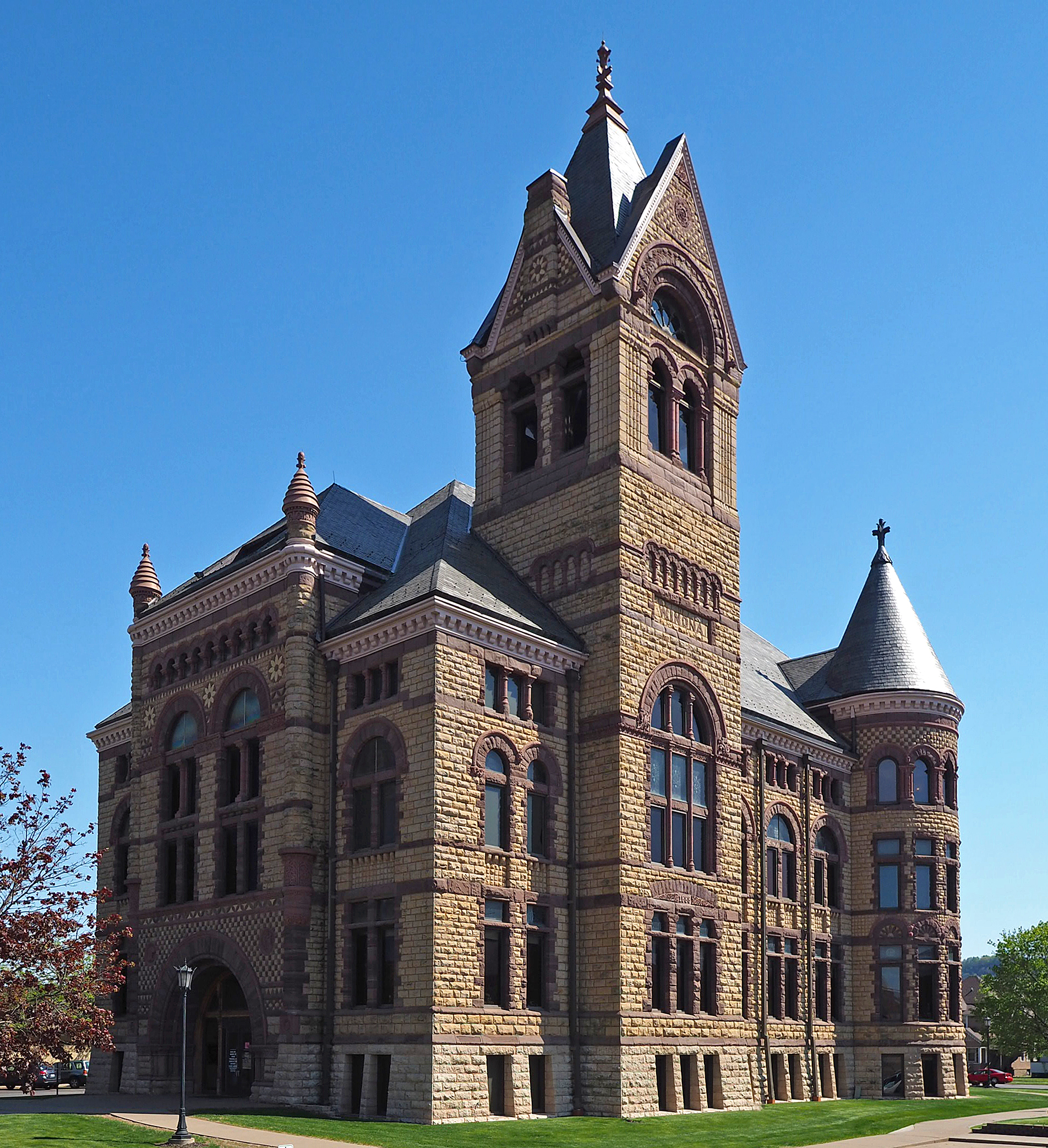
Winona County Courthouse

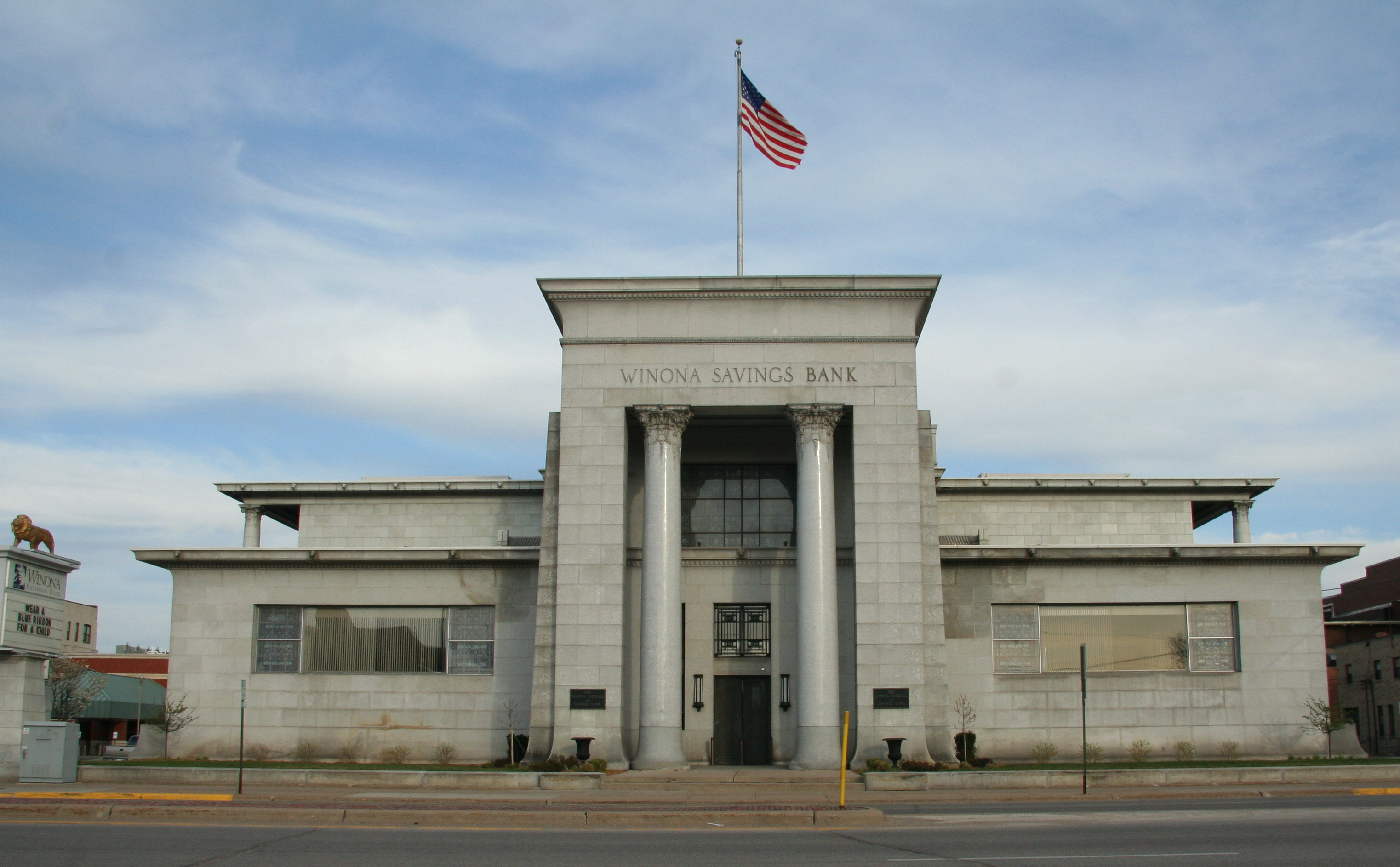
Historic Winona Savings Bank building

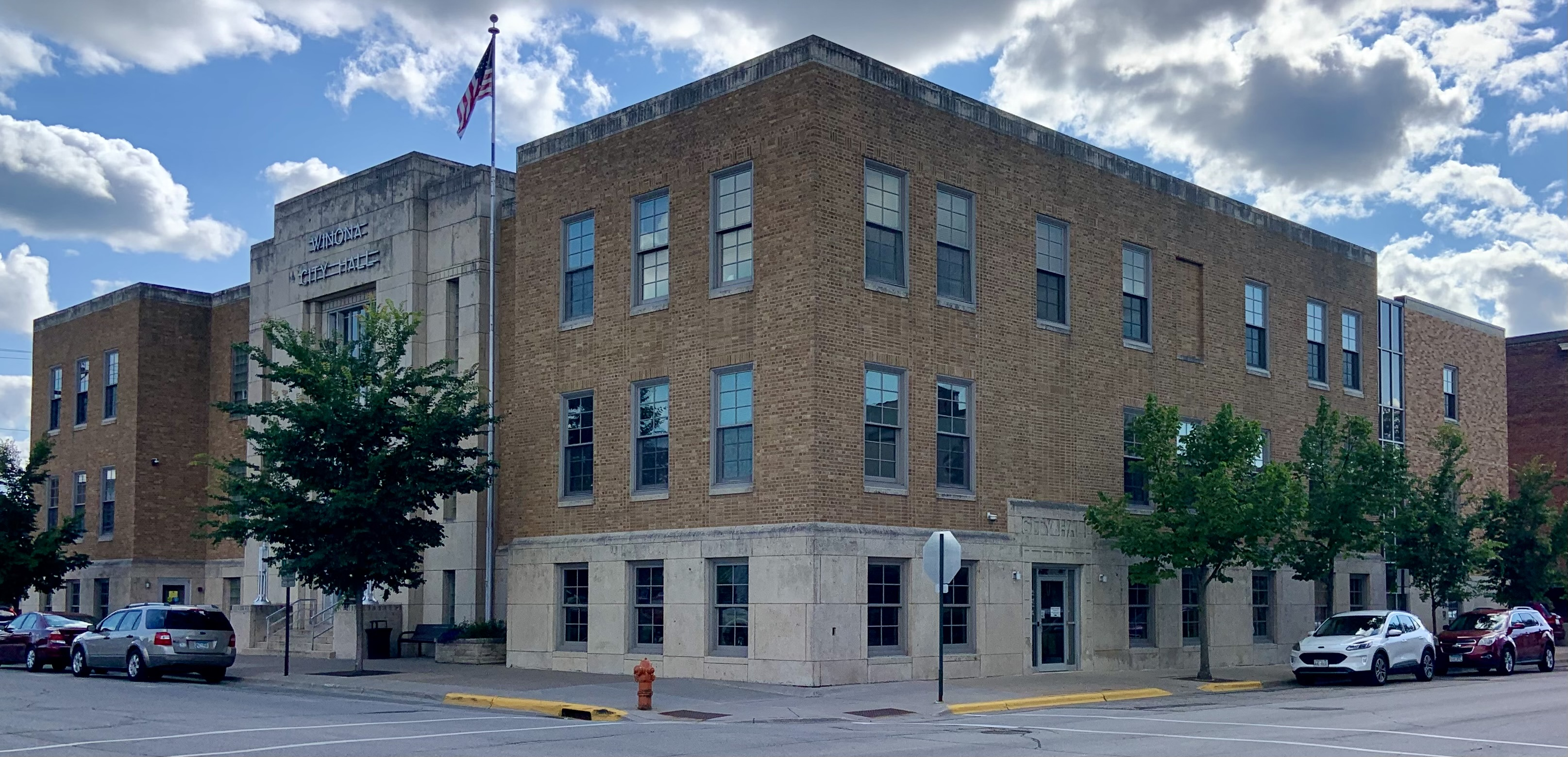
Winona City Hall
