= Józef Wrycza =

Kashubian Roman Catholic priest and activist (1884–1961)

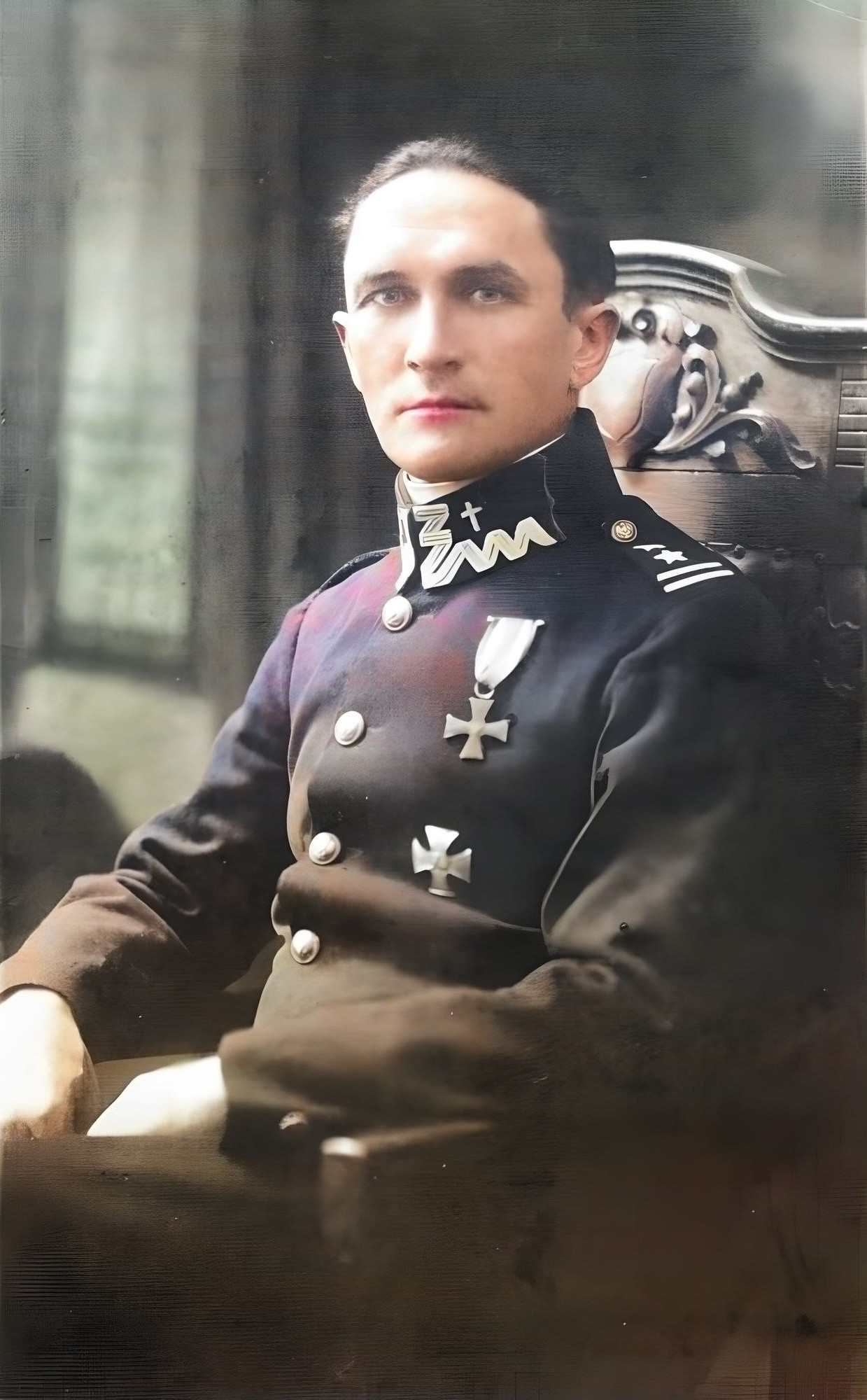
- Wrycza c. 1918-1925
- Born: February 4, 1884; Hochstüblau, Kreis Preußisch Stargard, German Empire (now Zblewo, Poland)
- Died: December 4, 1961 (aged 77); Tuchola, Bydgoszcz Voivodeship, Polish People's Republic
- Other names: Rawycz; Śmiały
- Parents: Franciszek Wryca (father); Franciszka née Trocha (mother)

Józef Wrycza (Polish pronunciation: [ˈjuzɛv ˈvrɨt͡ʂa]; 4 February 1884 – 4 December 1961) was a Polish Kashubian Roman Catholic priest, social activist, and military chaplain of the Polish Army.

== Childhood and education ==
He was born in Zblewo in the Prussian Partition of Poland, to Franciszek and Franciszka (Trocha) Wrycza, who were of Kashubian ethnicity. From 1894 to 1899 he attended the Collegium Marianum in Pelplin. He began his high school education in Chełmno and completed it in 1904 at the Collegium Leoninum at Wejherowo, where one of his classmates was the future Nazi German SS general Erich von dem Bach-Zelewski. Later that year he began studies at the Pelplin Higher Seminary (Wyższe Seminarium Duchowne w Pelplinie) and, on 23 February 1908, he was ordained a Roman Catholic priest.

== Early activism ==
Wrycza served a number of parishes between his ordination and the beginning of the First World War, and remained a fully committed Roman Catholic priest until his death. He also spent his life as an activist, however, for the Kashubian and later the Polish causes. In 1909 he was one of the founding members of the Society of Young Kashubians along with Aleksander Majkowski, Jan Karnowski, and Leon Heyke. Drafted into the German Army in 1914, he served for two years as a medic before returning in 1916 to his priestly duties. In 1917 he founded the Society of Polish Youth, an organization devoted to taking control of Poland by armed struggle, and barely escaped execution by the German Grenzschutz Ost in 1919, thanks to Bronisław Kurzętkowski as a member of the Military Organization Pomerania.

== The Second Polish Republic ==
Wrycza's social activism continued during the Second Polish Republic. He served as a chaplain in the Blue Army of General Józef Haller throughout the Polish–Soviet War, taking time out to celebrate Mass at Poland's Wedding to the Sea, at which event he also commemorated Kashubian contributions to Poland's fishing industry. His active military career ended when he transferred to the Polish Army Reserve in 1924. Serving as pastor in the church at Wiele from 1924 to 1939, he helped complete the Kalwaria Wielewska (Wiele Calvar), a set of Stations of the Cross created in the hills around Wiele, intended to commemorate Poles who fell in the World War. He was also involved in a wide range of political activities, most notably as a member of the conservative National Party. In this role he often found himself at odds with the Józef Piłsudski regime, and was even jailed for a while in 1935. He also found time to promote the Kashubian language and culture, including a 1935 edition of Hieronim Derdowski's 1884 poem Jasiek na Knieji (Johnny from the Forest).

== The Second World War ==
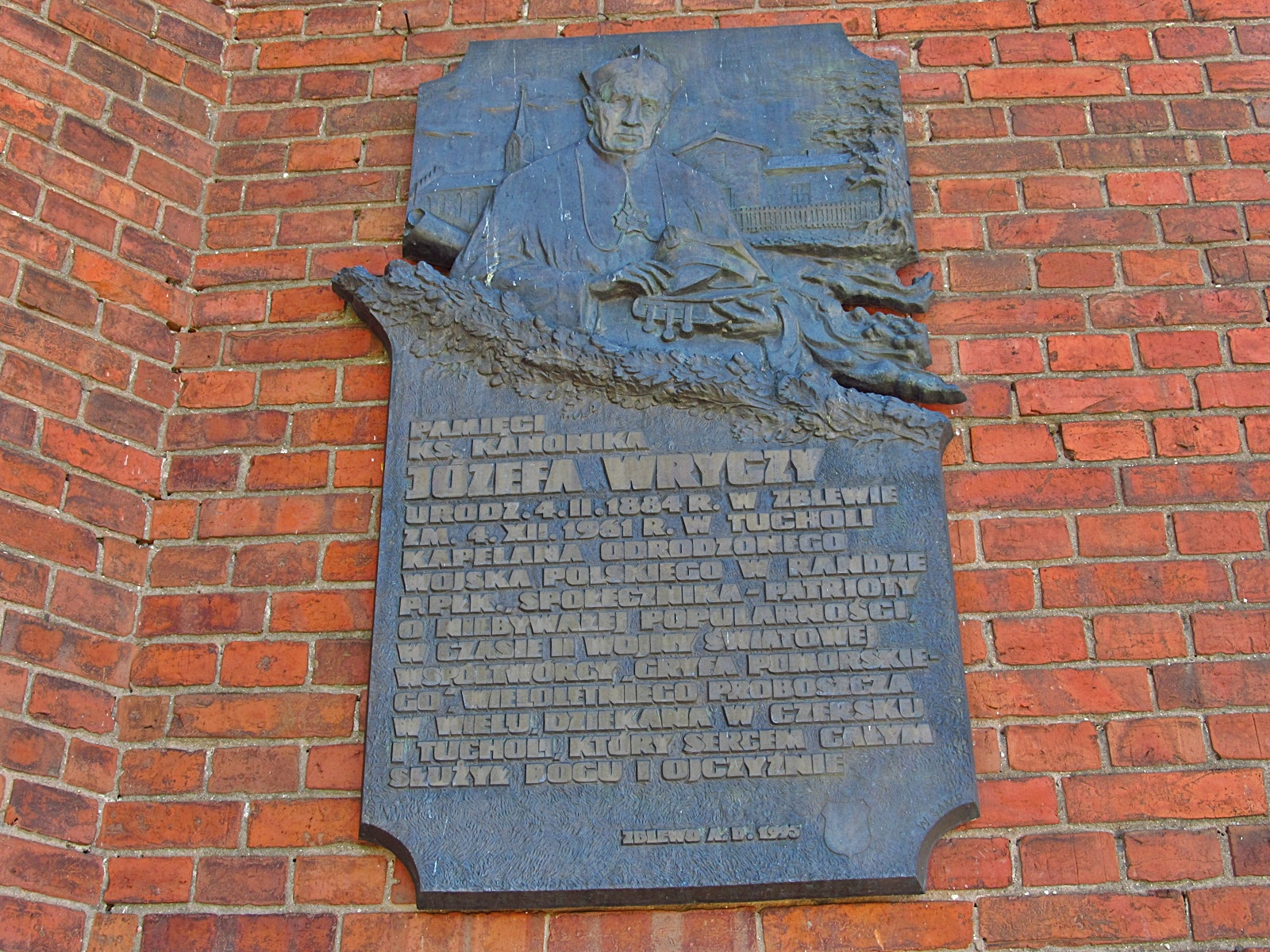
Memorial plaque to Józef Wrycza in Zblewo

After the defeat and occupation of Poland during the Second World War, Wrycza was involved along with members of the National Party in various resistance activities under the pseudonym Rawycz. He was actively recruited by the region-wide resistance organization Kashubian Griffin for his leadership qualities as soldier and as priest; he was already well known to its leadership, many of whom had also belonged to the Society of Young Kashubians. On 7 July 1941 Wrycza became president of an expanded version of the organization which was now called Pomeranian Griffin at his instance. Although Wrycza resigned from active leadership of Pomeranian Griffin in Spring 1943, such was his status that the organization mounted a disinformation campaign to convince the Germans that he was dead. Despite the German Army's best efforts to locate the so-called "priest general," Wrycza remained safely at the small hamlet of Czarna Dąbrowa near Bytów for the duration of the war.

== Postwar career ==
After the German Army was driven from Pomerania, Wrycza took up the struggle against the Soviets under the pseudonym of Śmiały. Yet this vision was not to be achieved until after his death, and he returned to his full-time priestly ministry in Wiele, and from 1948 onward, in Tuchola. Even then, he maintained the greatest possible resistance to Communist policies; it may well have been that his reputation as a Polish hero kept him out of prison. He died in Tuchola on 4 December 1961 and is buried in the parish cemetery there. His funeral became the occasion of a great patriotic celebration. On 4 December 2011 a monument in honor of Wrycza was dedicated in Tuchola on the fiftieth anniversary of his death.
