= Kashubian literature =

Kashubian literature appeared in Poland during the second half of the nineteenth century with Florian Cejnowa (1817–1881), who used the Sławoszyno dialect of the Puck region, and Hieronim Derdowski (1852–1902), who used the Wiele dialect of the Chojnice district. The latter enriched Kashubian literature especially in poetry.

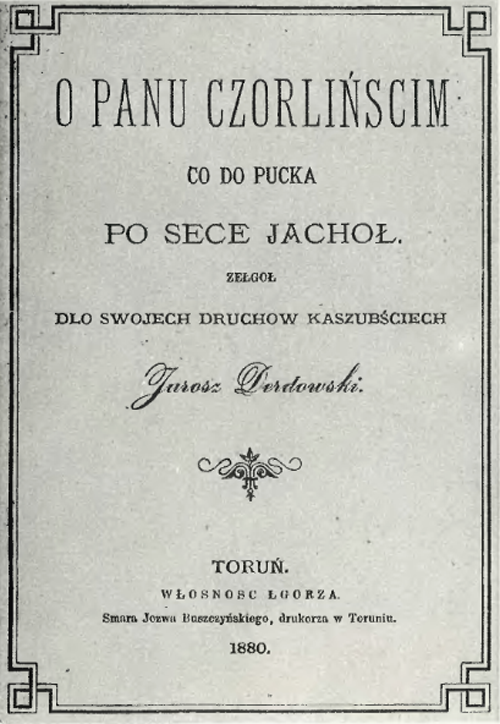
J.H. Derdowski, O Panu Czorlińścim co do Pucka po sece jachoł, Toruń 1880

Aleksander Majkowski (1876–1938) used the dialect of Koscierzyna-Lipusz, the district from which he came. His greatest achievement was the creation in 1908 of Gryf, the Kashubian periodical. He also wrote the only pre-war Kashubian novel in 1938.

In the last decade, about two hundred books have been published in Kashubian, including translations of international works. Anthologies and compendia have been written by Neureiter 1973, Drzeżdżon 1986, and Neureiter 1991.

In 1907, Izydor Gulgowski (1874–1925) and Friedrich Lorentz founded the Association for Kashubian Folk Traditions in Kartuzy.

Izydor Gulgowski founded the Kaszubski Park Etnograficzny in the village of Wdzydze Kiszewskie in the Chojnice district. It is the oldest open-air museum in Poland. The museum had and still has an important influence on the cultural life and traditions of Kashubia.

Among the modern Kashubian writers are Leon Heyke, Marian Jeliński, Jan Karnowski, Aleksander Labuda, Anna Łajming, Jan Trepczyk, Jan Rompski, Franciszek Grucza, Jan Piepka, Alojzy Nagel, Jan Drzeżdżon, Stanisław Pestka, Stefan Fikus, Marian Majkowski, Eugeniusz Pryczkowski, Stanisław Janke, Ida Czaja, Roman Drzeżdżon, Tomasz Fopke.

Polish-language writers from Kashubia also include Lech Bądkowski, Franciszek Fenikowski, Róża Ostrowska, and Jerzy Samp.
