= Lech Bądkowski =

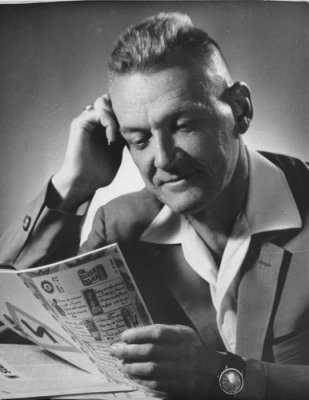
- Born: Leszek Mieczysław Zygmunt Buntkowski; January 24, 1920; Toruń, Second Polish Republic
- Died: January 24, 1984 (aged 64); Śródmieście, Gdańsk, Polish People's Republic
- Resting place: Wrzeszcz Górny
- Education: University of Łódź
- Organization: Kashubian–Pomeranian Association
- Political party: Ruch Młodej Polski
- Spouse: Zofia Janiszewska
- Children: Sławina
- Parents: Kazimierz Buntkowski (father); Zofia née Faustmann (mother)

Lech Bądkowski (24 January 1920 – 24 February 1984) was a Polish writer, journalist, publicist and Kashubian-Pomeranian activist, a promoter of regional history and culture, co-founder and leader of the Kashubian-Pomeranian Association, and opponent of Communist rule in post-war Poland.

== Early life ==
Lech Bądkowski was born Leszek Mieczysław Zygmunt Buntkowski on 24 January 1920 in Toruń, Poland. There he attended elementary school and an all male high school. In 1938 he was admitted to the law faculty at the Józef Piłsudski University of Warsaw, but seven days into the academic year he was drafted into the Polish army. During his service, he completed a junior officer course. When the Second World War broke out on 1 September 1939 Bądkowski participated as a platoon commander in the Battle of the Bzura, which he later recounted in his book Żołnierze znad Bzury (Soldiers from the Bzura River). In 1940, Bądkowski managed to escape to France where he joined the newly formed Polish army. Under the rank of Aspirant, Bądkowski fought in the Norwegian and French campaigns, where he showed outstanding courage for which he was awarded the Silver Cross of the Virtuti Militari, the highest Polish military honor, by Gen. Władysław Sikorski in 1941. After evacuation from France he completed a sabotage and skydiving course in Scotland but was never to be dropped behind enemy lines into occupied Poland. Bądkowski was discharged from the army as a second lieutenant. While stationed in Britain he learned English, continued his general education, and participated in the activities of the Pomeranian Union which he had created. During this time, he also completed the booklet Pomorska myśl polityczna (1945) on Pomeranian political thought.

== Early career (Stalin Era) ==
Bądkowski returned to Poland in 1946, settling in Gdynia. His life goal was to become a politician, but he soon abandoned this idea and took up journalism. Bądkowski worked at the Dziennik Bałtycki, having numerous articles he had written published. In 1947 he married Zofia Janiszewska, and in 1953 their daughter Sławina was born. Around this time he changed his name from Buntkowski, a Germanised version of his family name from Poland’s partitions, to "Bądkowski". He also finished a course in commerce and political science studies at a college in Sopot, before receiving a diploma in political science studies from the University of Łódź faculty for Law and Administration. Bądkowski moved to Gdańsk in 1951, residing at 79-80 Długa Street. His first book Kuter na strądzie (A Fishing Boat on shore) was published in 1952. From 1953 he became active in the Polish Writers' Union but was soon demoted from his role within it by the communist authorities who mistrusted his ideological positions, which could have been influenced by his wartime experience with the western allies. He ended up working as literary director at the Miniatura puppet theater in Gdańsk. He later become the deputy editor to Maria Boniecka, editor-in-chief of the weekly Ziemia i Morze.

== After the October 1956 thaw ==
In 1956 Bądkowski co-founded the Kashubian Association, which later became the Kashubian-Pomeranian Association KPA), and created its ideological manifesto. From it foundation, he was an active member of the KPA's leadership. He wrote an outline of the history of Kashubian literature in 1958, prepared a deep analysis of the organization’s activities from the time of its creation, and worked to widen its recognition in society. Between 1957–66 he was also Chairman of the Gdańsk branch of Polish Writers' Union. It was during this period that he wrote his most popular books: Wesoło w tropikach (It’s joyful in tropics) and Bitwa trwa (The Battle continues), a collection of short stories. Bądkowski translated the Kashubian novel The Life and Adventures of Remus by Aleksander Majkowski into Polish. In 1965 he was awarded the Order of Polonia Restituta. He also wrote articles for the daily Głos Wybrzeża (Voice of the Coast), and for well over a dozen magazines. Some of his texts were broadcast on the Polish Radio Gdańsk. Bądkowski authored and published about one book a year, with some being reprinted. Starting in the mid sixties, his rejection of communist rule and censorship grew stronger, to such an extent that in 1968 he openly protested with two fellow Pomeranian writers against the communist party's clamp down on the student protests demanding more freedom.

== The 1970s – Edward Gierek period ==
From the early 1970s Bądkowski's creative output slowed down due to censorship inflicted by the communist apparatus combined with his lifestyle and addictions that led to health problems. During these years Bądkowski still managed to edit and preface two books of the Kashubian author Augustyn Necel Z deszczu pod rynnę (When it rains it pours) and Rewianie (The citizens of Rewa), and a work by the Rev. Jerzy Pobłocki. His own literary work at the time concentrated on the Vistula, Pomerania and its history. In the mid-1970s Bądkowski planned on writing a six part cycle of novels on the beginnings of the Pomeranian state, but completed only two volumes: Młody książę (The Young Prince) and Chmury (Clouds). For his creative work and activity promoting Pomerania he was awarded the Stolem Medal in 1978. From 1979 he was a member of the Polish branch of the PEN Club. He wrote about 1000 articles and over 30 books and pamphlets, some of which were reprinted. He became an object of interest of the Security Service (SB) and his office and the apartment were bugged. He was tagged with the code name Inspirator in SB files. Towards the end of the 1970s he joined in the underground activity of the Gdańsk conservative and liberal circles concentrated around the Ruch Mlodej Polski organization. In 1978 he published a political essay Kaszubsko-Pomorskie drogi (Kashubian-Pomeranian paths), which had previously been banned by the censor, through an underground publishing house.

== The 1980s ==
As a representative of the area's literary circles, Bądkowski joined with the striking Gdańsk Shipyard workers in August 1980, and from 21 August became a member of the Inter-Enterprise Strike Committee the same month, and later its spokesman and member of the group negotiating the Gdańsk Agreement. He created a discussion club of political thought named after the Constitution of 3 May. In 1980 he began editing an insert titled Samorządność (Self governanace) in Dziennik Bałtycki. On 1 August 1981 he was awarded a medal for the popularization of culture, arts and knowledge about Gdańsk by the city’s mayor Jerzy Młynarczyk. On 17 August Lech Wałęsa authorized Bądkowski to create a weekly Samorządność newspaper based on his insert in Dziennik Bałtycki. Only three editions were published starting in November 1981 before being suspended during Martial Law in Poland at the end of that year. Bądkowski remained its editor-in-chief until the end of 1982. During martial law he published in the Bratniak and Własne Zdanie, underground magazines, whilst working on preparing the fourth edition of the Samorządność weekly, which did not get distributed during the Solidarity era. In the process of doing so, he gathered around himself many young Solidarity activists. In 1982 he was awarded the Swiętopełk award for his lifelong activities to benefit the cause of the Pomeranian region.

== Death ==
From the end of the 1970s Bądkowski had been ill with cancer, which he eventually died from on 24 February 1984 in his apartment on Długa Street. Toward the end of his life he was able to welcome the birth of his grandson Barnim Bądkowski born (b. 1979). His granddaughter Miłoslawa was born after his death. He was buried at Srebrzysko cemetery in Wrzeszcz Górny. Five thousand people attended his funeral, among them Zbigniew Herbert, Bronisław Geremek, Wałęsa, and Donald Tusk. The ceremony transformed into an anti-government manifestation. Later on, the grave was adorned with a sculpture of the Kashubian Griffin with the words "Lech Bądkowski – writer, soldier, citizen" inscribed upon it.

== Legacy ==
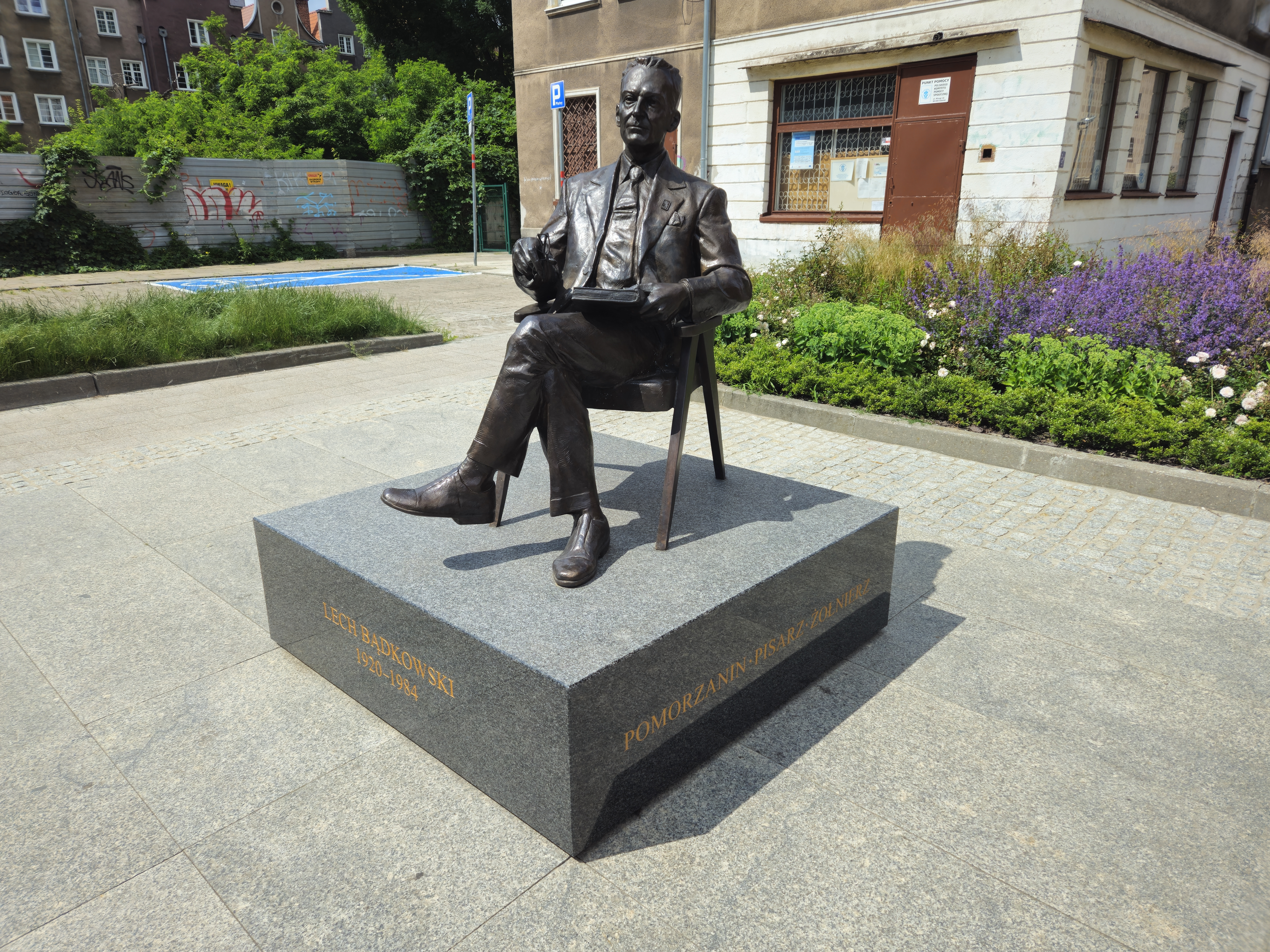
Memorial to Lech Bądkowski in Gdańsk

In 1987 Bądkowski became a patron of the literary award of the Kashubian-Pomeranian association. In 1988 a commemorative plaque was placed on the building where his office was located, bearing the inscription: “In this house Lech Bądkowski lived and created between 1960 and 1984. He was a writer, a Kashubian-Pomeranian activist, a signatory of the Gdańsk Shipyard Agreements in 1980”.

From May 1991 Bądkowski became a patron of the elementary school in Luzino. Around this time a street was named after him in the Siedlce neighborhood of Gdańsk and the middle school in nearby Jasień. In 2000 he received the posthumous the title of honorary Citizen of Gdańsk. A remembrance gathering took place to celebrate the occasion on 22 February, and on 7 March a special exhibition dedicated to Bądkowski was opened in the Plame gallery entitled: “Lech Bądkowski – a human, writer, citizen”

Several minor streets in Gdańsk, Rumia, as well as the Kociewian cities of Tczew and Starogard Gdański were later named after him too.

On 3 May 2006 President Lech Kaczyński awarded Bądkowski the posthumous Order of Polonia Restituta. Since 2006 the monthly Pomerania has published the memories of people who knew Bądkowski. The film Inspirator was made about Bądkowski and was shown in Gdańsk, Gdynia and Luzino and on TV. In the last few years, in addition to many commemorative gatherings, several of his books have been republished, 3 books and 3 masters thesis’s have been written about him. To commemorate the 25th anniversary of his death, the year 2009, was proclaimed the Lech Bądkowski Year. On 18 February the Senate officially commemorated the anniversary of his death. On the same day, the then Prime Minister Tusk, and the marshal of the senate Bogdan Borusewicz opened an exhibition entitled Authorities: Lech Bądkowski staged by the European Solidarity Centre which also published a pamphlet containing a comprehensive biographical essay. Also in Frye same month, the correspondence between Bądkowski and his long time friend Maciej Słomczyński was republished.

Bądkowski is also a patron of a Carillon in Gdańsk Town Hall.

== Bibliography ==
- J. Borzyszkowski, D. Albrecht (red.): Pomorze – mała ojczyzna Kaszubów. Historia i współczesność. Kaschubisch-Pommersche Heimat. Geschichte und Gegenwart, Gdańsk-Lubeka 2000, pp. 454–457 (German/Polish)
