= Pomeranian Griffin =

Polish anti-Nazi resistance group

Secret Military Organization "Pomeranian Griffin"
- Tajna Organizacja Wojskowa „Gryf Pomorski”
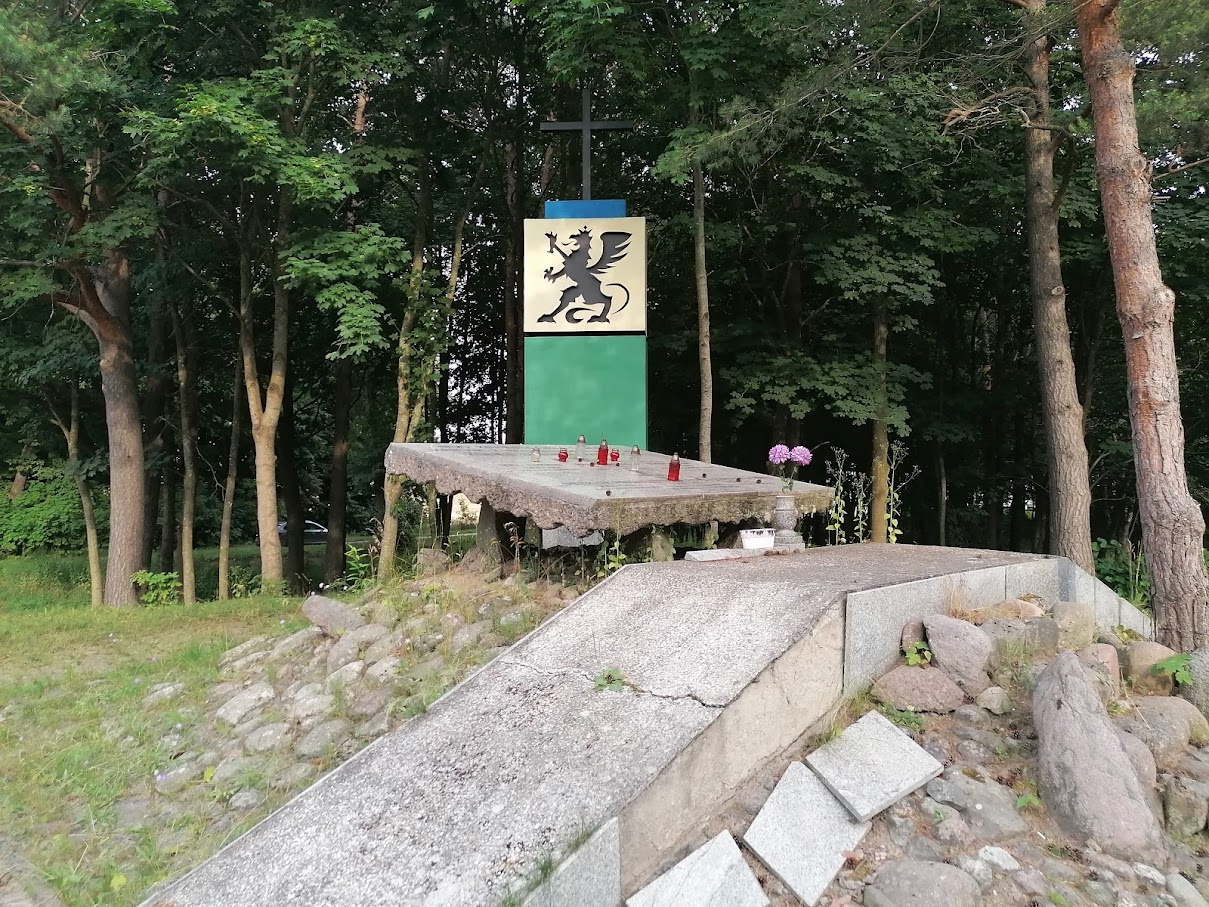
- Active: 7 July 1941 - 21 March 1945
- Country: German-occupied Poland
- Allegiance: Polish Underground State
- Type: Paramilitary
- Role: Linked to the National Democracy
- Size: c. 6000-8000 (1944)
- Engagements: East Pomeranian offensive (1945)

Commanders
- Notable commanders: Józef Wrycza; Józef Dambek; Augustyn Westphal

The Pomeranian Griffin secret military organization (Polish: Tajna Organizacja Wojskowa Gryf Pomorski) was a Polish anti-Nazi resistance group active in Pomerania and East Prussia during World War II. A major Polish resistance organization in the Pomerania region, at its height in 1943 it might have had as many as 20,000 members, although only about 500 were active partisans in the forests (leśni).

The name of the organization referred to the traditional coat of arms of Pomerania, which consists of either the black (for Gdansk Pomerania) or the red (for Western Pomerania) griffin.

== Formation ==
After the German invasion of Poland, Polish Pomeranian territories were annexed into the German Reichsgau Danzig-West Prussia. As elsewhere in Poland, resistance organizations soon appeared. The Pomeranian Griffin organization was created on July 7, 1941 in Czarna Dąbrowa near Bytów, out of three smaller predecessor organizations: the Kashubian Griffin secret military organization (Tajna Organizacjia Wojskowa "Gryf Kaszubski"), the Military Organization for Independence (Wojskowa Organizacja Niepodległościowa), and a partisan unit codenamed "Zawisza" (after Zawisza the Black). According to Polish historian Tomasz Strzembosz, the groundwork for the organization might have been laid down before the war by Colonel Ludwik Muzyczki.

The Griffin, traditional symbol of Pomerania, after which the organization was named.

== Operations ==
The organization's charter stressed its Catholic nature and declared its purpose as self-defense, aid to the Polish population of Pomerania in the face of German terror, and preparation for an eventual uprising against Nazi Germany. In addition to sabotage operations carried out by its forest partisan units, the organization was active in spreading anti-Nazi propaganda and in intelligence activities (notably, the Pomeranian Griffin was involved in the intelligence gathering on the V-1 and V-2 rockets).

The organization declared itself subordinate to the Polish Government in Exile in London, and cooperated with the military structures of the Polish Underground State (Armia Krajowa, the "Home Army") but stressed its regional autonomy. In 1943 internal ideological conflicts escalated during negotiations over the subordination of the organization to the main Polish anti-Nazi resistance movement, the Home Army. Polish resistance structures in Pomerania had suffered more than their fair share of arrests, and Griffin leaders were wary of opening themselves up to a larger structure. Furthermore, whereas the Home Army and the government in exile were run by a coalition of several parties, Griffin, while officially apolitical, was mostly influenced by the National Democrats. A portion of the Griffin split to join the Miecz i Plug (Sword and Plow) nationalist movement. However, Miecz i Plug had been infiltrated by the Gestapo or, according to other sources, by NKVD agents who first framed existing leaders for collaboration and then proceeded to establish real contacts with the Gestapo. Either way, as a result, many of the conspirators of the Griffin were compromised, arrested by the Nazis, and sent to Nazi concentration camps.

The remnants of the group survived until 1945, when the final order of its last commander instructed the soldiers to participate in the disarming of local German police forces and to provide logistic aid to the approaching Red Army. By the order of liquidation of TOW "Gryf Pomorski" (January 21, 1945), the last leader Augustyn Westphal ordered the members of the organization to lay down their weapons, reveal themselves and join the Polish People's Army and the Citizens' Militia. This was probably caused by fears of repressions by the communist authorities against the decimated ranks of the organization or an attempt to infiltrate the communist apparatus of repression. However, once Pomerania came under Soviet control, members of the group were persecuted and arrested by the Soviet authorities because of the organization's pro-Catholic and nationalistic character. Many of the group's members who were arrested during this time ended up being sent to the gulag by the Soviets, alongside the same German soldiers and Gestapo agents against whom they fought during the war; others were executed. Some historians argue that Griffin soldiers were treated much more harshly than even the Armia Krajowa and the cursed soldiers members. In arresting the group's members the Soviet authorities often relied on information provided by former Gestapo agents who had infiltrated the group during the war and who had switched sides once Soviet victory was imminent.

== Members ==
Three of the Pomeranian Griffin's most notable members were Lieutenant Józef Dambek, Griffin's leader, Jan Gierszewski; (Code named major Rys)...reference Poland magazine Jan. 1969 and Colonel-Chaplain Józef Wrycza, a widely respected Roman Catholic priest. After Lieutenant Dambek was killed by the Germans in 1944, he was succeeded by Lieutenant Augustyn Westphal.

== See also ==
- Wanda Błeńska
- Jan Rompsczi
