= Society of Young Kashubians =

Kashubian cultural organisation in the German Empire and interwar Poland

The Society of Young Kashubians (Kashubian: Towarzëstwò Młodokaszëbów, Polish: Towarzystwo Młodokaszubów) was an association founded in 1912 in Gdańsk (Poland). Its leader was Dr. Aleksander Majkowski, already a well-known Kashubian writer and author of The Life and Adventures of Remus. Other influential members of the association were the attorney Jan Karnowski and two Roman Catholic priests, Leon Heyke and Józef Wrycza.

== Objectives of the Society ==
The Society of Young Kashubians worked to awaken ethnic self-awareness among the Kashubian people, to promote understanding of Kashubian culture and to connect Kashubians with the Polish scientific movement. Young Kashubians published their literary works in the "Gryf" (The Griffon) magazine. Their motto was What is Kashubian is Polish at the same time, an echo of Hieronim Derdowski's famous line: No Kaszubia without Poland, no Poland without Kaszubia. In the words of the scholar Jozef Borzyszkowski:

As the continuers of both Ceynowa’s and Derdowski’s ideas, the Young-Kashubs created a movement which could be called Kashubian-Pomeranian. They stressed the regional community of Kashubia-Pomerania, and alongside the Kashubian identity also emphasised a national Polish identity. They made themselves and the world realise that the Kashubs were a community of various cultures – Kashubian, Polish and also German..

The motto What is Kashubian is Polish at the same time expressed the Society's belief that despite variations within the Kashubian language, Kashubians as a whole made up an indispensable part of the Polish nation, as confirmed by common history, culture and religion. Such a belief conflicted with the position expressed by Florian Ceynowa and others that Kashubia was better associated with the pan-Slavic movement than with Poland. However, Ceynowa's reservations about Polonization eventually became a concern to some members of the Society, including Dr. Majkowski himself.

== History and influence ==
The Young Kashubians based their writing primarily on Kashubian mythology and tradition. They criticized the increasing superstition and drunkenness among Kashubians, which is shown inter alia in Majkowski's satirical epic poem Jak w Koscérznie kòscelnégò òbrelë abò piãc kawalerów a jednô jedinô brutka ("How they chose the Sacristan at Koscierzyna, or Five bridegrooms and only one bride," 1899) and in Jan Karnowski's volume of poetry, Nowotne spiewë i wiersze ("New Songs and Poems," 1910).

The Young Kashubians met with fierce opposition. Germanizers within the Kashubian community naturally opposed the Young Kashubians, as did the Polish-language journals Pielgrzym and Gazeta Grudziądzka. Accusations and recriminations were hurled, and eventually brought to court. The onset of the First World War saw an end to the Society's efforts. Despite its short life and its comparatively scanty literary output, the Society of Young Kashubians proved that a Kashubian literary movement could succeed, and served as inspiration to all succeeding Kashubian literary groups.
