= Zblewo =

Village in Pomeranian Voivodeship, Poland

- Village
- Saint Michael Archangel church in Zblewo

- Location within Poland
- Coordinates: 53°56′5″N 18°19′46″E
- Country: Poland
- Voivodeship: Pomeranian
- County: Starogard
- Gmina: Zblewo
- Highest elevation: 132 m (433 ft)
- Lowest elevation: 102 m (335 ft)

Population
  - Total: 3,615
- Time zone: UTC+1 (CET)
  - Summer (DST): UTC+2 (CEST)
- Vehicle registration: GST
- Website: www.zblewo.pl

Zblewo [ˈzblɛvɔ] is a village in Starogard County, Pomeranian Voivodeship, in northern Poland. It is the seat of Gmina Zblewo. It is located within the ethnocultural region of Kociewie in the historic region of Pomerania.

== History ==
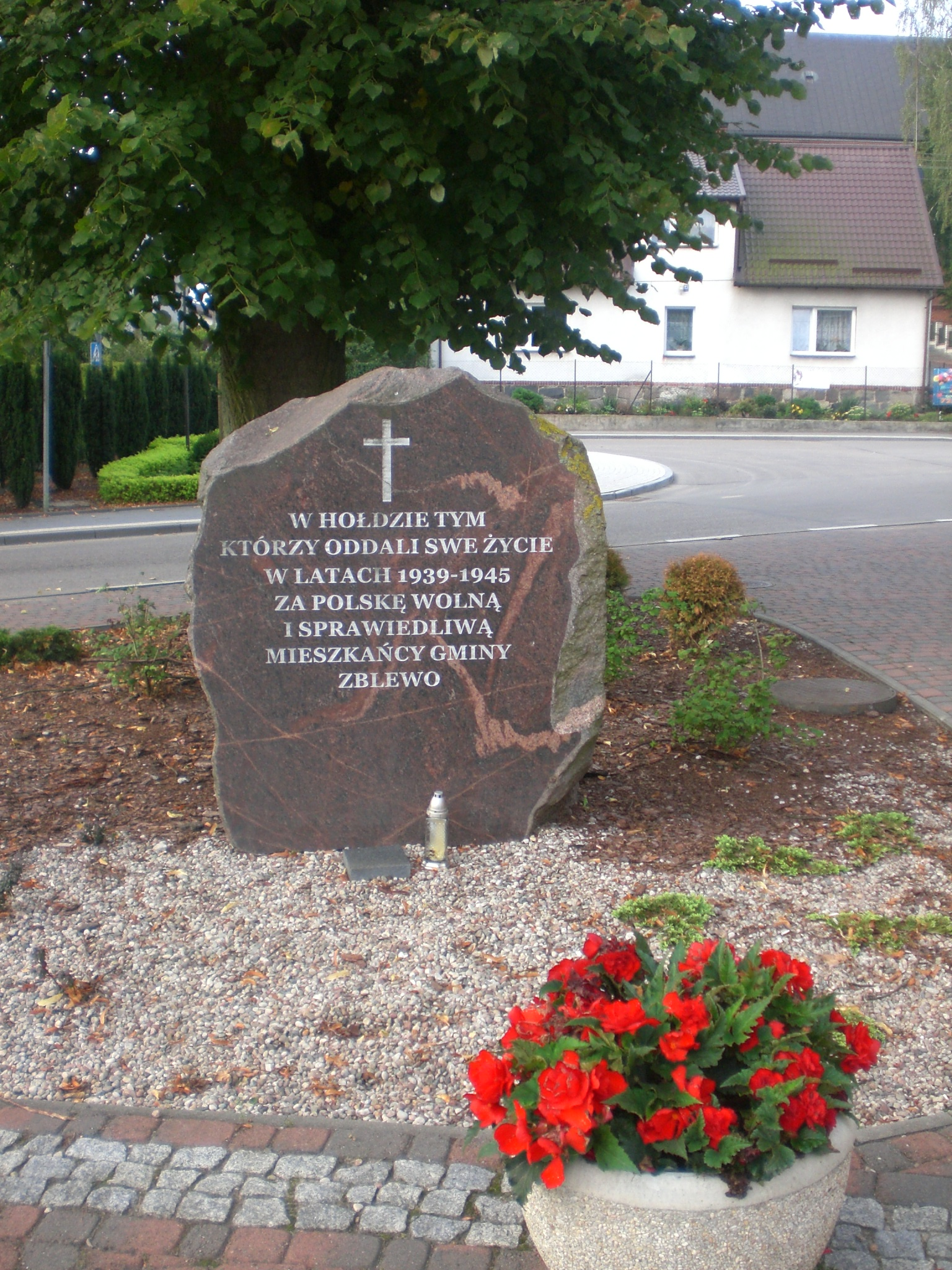
World War II memorial

The oldest mention of the village dates back to 1305. Zblewo was a royal village of the Kingdom of Poland, administratively located in the Tczew County in the Pomeranian Voivodeship.

It was annexed by Prussia in the First Partition of Poland in 1772. The development of Zblewo in the latter half of the 19th century is primarily associated with the construction of the Prussian Eastern Railway. After World War I, Poland regained independence and control of the village.

Following the German-Soviet invasion of Poland, which started World War II in September 1939, the village was occupied by Germany until 1945. In 1939, the German Nazis murdered several Poles from Zblewo, including a local priest, along with Poles from other villages in large massacres in the Szpęgawski Forest as part of the Intelligenzaktion Pommern. Three pre-war Polish policemen from Zblewo were murdered by the Russians in the Katyn massacre in 1940. The Polish resistance printed Polish underground press in Zblewo.

== Transport ==
The village is served by a railway station on the Tczew–Kostrzyn route, line 203.

Zblewo is located on the national road DK22 in between Chojnice and Starogard Gdański on the route running from Gorzów Wielkopolski to the Russian border in Masuria.

== Amenities ==
Zblewo has a shopping centre, as well as shops located in the village centre, a sports centre that includes a football pitch and basketball court, and a park.

== Sports ==
The village is represented by the football team Sokół Zblewo who, as of 2026, play in the Klasa A division. The village's municipal stadium is also the home ground of KS Sławek Borzechowo from the neighbouring village of Borzechowo.

== Notable people ==
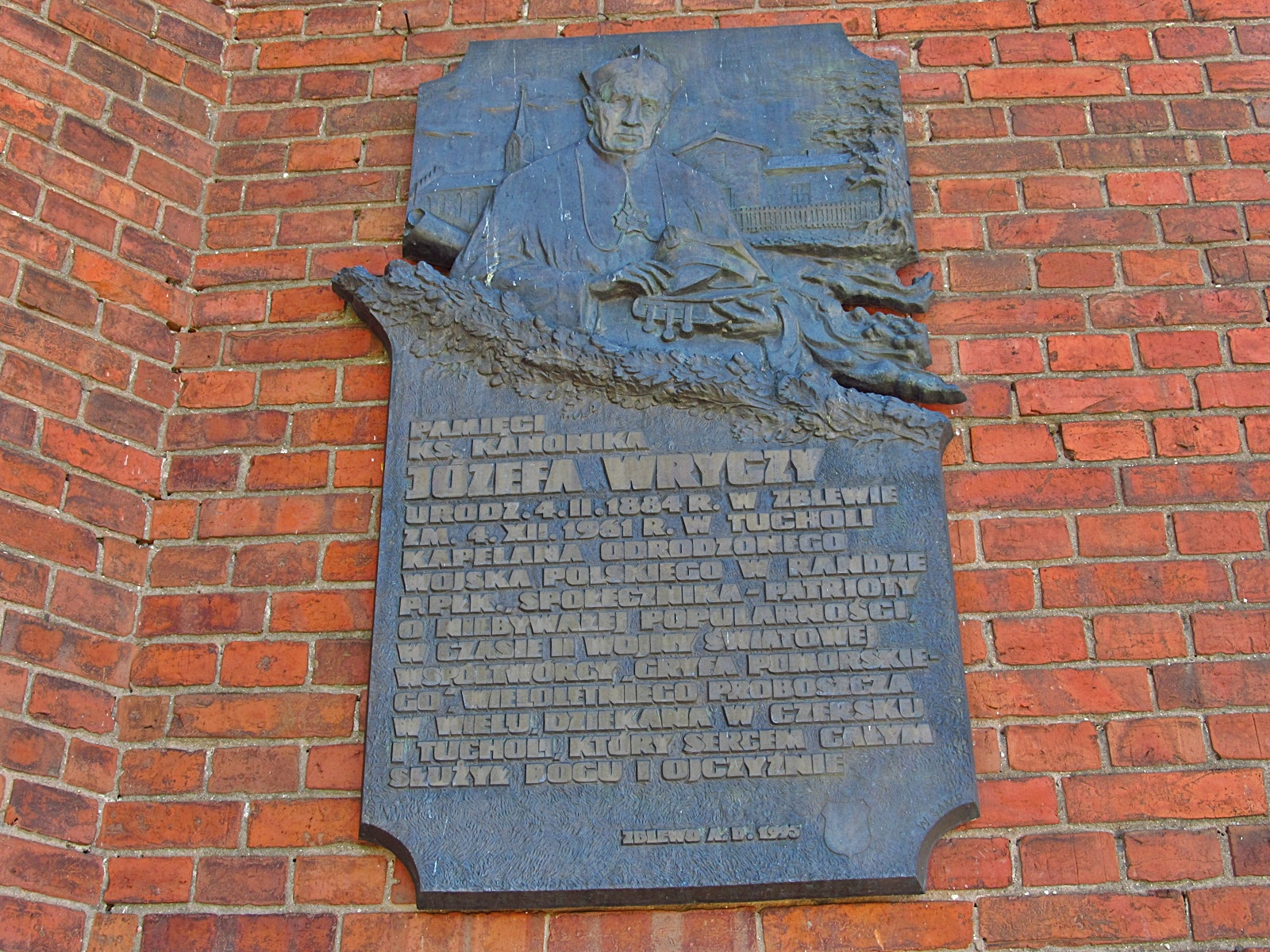
Memorial plaque to Józef Wrycza

- Józef Wrycza (1884–1961), Polish Catholic priest, pro-independence activist, member of the Polish resistance movement in World War II
- Hanna Polk (1963–2019), Polish actress
