= Czarnowo, Pomeranian Voivodeship =

Village in Pomeranian Voivodeship, Poland

Czarnowo Czôrnowò
- Village
- Location within Poland
- Coordinates: 53°53′36″N 17°41′17″E
- Country: Poland
- Voivodeship: Pomeranian
- County: Chojnice
- Gmina: Brusy

Population
  - Total: 217
- Time zone: UTC+1 (CET)
  - Summer (DST): UTC+2 (CEST)
- Vehicle registration: GCH

Czarnowo [t͡ʂarˈnɔvɔ] (Kashubian: Czôrnowò) is a village in the administrative district of Gmina Brusy, within Chojnice County, Pomeranian Voivodeship, in northern Poland. It is located in the ethnocultural region of Kashubia in the historic region of Pomerania.

== Notable people ==
Jan Karnowski was born here.
