= Jan Karnowski =

Kashubian poet and activist (1886–1939)

- Born: 16 May 1886; Czarnowo
- Died: 2 October 1939 (aged 53); Wyrzysk

Jan Karnowski (Kashubian: Jón Kôrnowsczi, nom de plume Wôś Budzysz; 16 May 1886 – 2 October 1939) was a Kashubian judge, poet and ideologist and contributor of the Young Kashubians movement.

== Life history ==
=== Childhood and early life ===
Jan Karnowski was born on 16 May 1886 in Czarnowo, into a peasant family of noble lineage; he was a son of Jan Karnowski and Anna née Wnuk-Lipińska. The family probably came from the village of Karnowo near Nakło nad Notecią but moved to Kashubia from the village of Dąbrówka (part of modern Skórka) in the former Złotów county (powiat złotowski).

He began his education in a Catholic folk school in Czarnowo. Then, in the years 1898–1904, he attended the episcopal secondary school of Collegium Marianum in Pelplin, where he met regionalists, inter alia, Father Romuald Frydrychowicz, Father Franciszek Rąbiec, Father Paweł Pansk, and Father Bolesław Domański. It was in Collegium Marianum that Karnowski's fascination with Kashubia began. In 1902, as a pupil, he wrote about reading with his friends Stanisław Czarnowski and Bolesław Piechowski Aleksander Majkowski's poem "About electing the sexton in Kościerzyna, or five bachelors and only one girl" ("Jak w Koscérznie koscelnégo obrelë, abo pięc kawalerów a jednô jedynô brutka") and Hieronim Derdowski's work "About Mr Czorliński who went to Puck to get nets" ("Ò Panu Czôrlińsczim, co do Pucka po sécë jachôł"); as Karnowski himself wrote in his diary, the books "aroused his fascination".

He continued his education in the junior high school of Chojnice in the years 1904–1907. In that time, since 1905, he was a member of the Tomasz Zan Society secret circle of philomates, and was its chairman between 1906-1907. At school, he read, inter alia, Aleksander Majkowski's volume of verse entitled "Spiewë i frantówci" (Poznań 1905). He participated in the Polish junior high school pupils' trip to Kraków in 1906. He finished his junior high school education in Chojnice by obtaining the Polish school-leaving examination certificate (świadectwo maturalne) on 9 March 1907.

In the same year, he began theological studies in the Pelplin Seminary. Out of the teaching circle of the Seminary professors, he especially valued two: Father Franciszek Sawicki, a philosopher, and Father Brunon Czapla, a historian. Since the beginning of his studies, Karnowski was actively involved in self-education; he delivered many speeches during the meetings of Polish seminarians. He continued studying Kashubia on his own by regularly reading "Annual Bound Volumes of the Scientific Society of Toruń" ("Roczniki Towarzystwa Naukowego w Toruniu"), including the works of professor Józef Łęgowski and professor Kazimierz Nitsch. However, it was only the reading of the "Dictionary of the Pomeranian, that is Kashubian, language" ("Słownik języka pomorskiego, czyli kaszubskiego") by Stefan Ramułt, that made "stunning impression" on him. It was probably this book that induced Karnowski to change the major of his higher education studies in order to be able to fully commit himself to studying Kashubia. In 1908, he founded the Circle of Kashubiologists (Koło Kaszubologów), embracing in the beginning 34 seminarians. In the same year, during holidays, in Kościerzyna, Karnowski met Aleksander Majkowski, who was then a man of letters and a socio-political activist (the chairman and founder of the student organisation "Vistula" ("Wisła"), the editor-in-chief of "Gazeta Gdańska" and "Drużba"). The meeting with Karnowski encouraged Majkowski to publish the first issue of "Gryf" which, having reached Pelplin, became the daily topic for discussion among Kashubiologists. During the same holidays, Karnowski visited Wdzydze, where he met Gulgowscy for the first time. The very trip made an enormous impression on him, to which he devoted a report published in "Gryf". Having passed the rigorosum examination in 1910 and obtained the scholarship of the Society of Scientific Help for the Youth of West Prussia (Towarzystwo Pomocy Naukowej Dla Młodzieży Prus Zachodnich), he left Pelplin and went to Freiburg for further studies. He later mentioned: "those Kashubian studies in 1908 and 1909 were decisive and they gave direction to all my later life. I went away from or forgot about this direction for a few times in my life, but each time I came out bad on it. I became convinced that this is the soil meant for me, which I have to, whether I want it or not, till until the end of my life".

In Freiburg, he enrolled in theological studies, then he transferred for law. In his new academic circle, he came across Ferdynand Bieszke who gathered around himself local Polish and Kashubian environments, being an authority and a shining example for Karnowski. During his studies, Karnowski prepared a lot of papers but his most important work of this time was a paper on "The development of the Polish nationality in West Prussia in the 19th century" ("O rozwoju narodowości polskiej w Prusach Zachodnich w XIX stuleciu"), which was then published in "Gryf" under the title "Kashubian People in the Previous Century" ("Ludność kaszubska w ubiegłym stuleciu"), and a volume of verse "Nowotné spiéwë" (Poznań 1910). In this period, Karnowski also widened his contacts with an outstanding researcher of the Kashubian language, Friedrich Lorentz. He met him, together with Aleksander Majkowski, in Kartuzy.

In 1911, he moved to the University of Wrocław to continue studying law. There, he founded the Circle of Academicians of Royal Prussia (Koło Akademików Prus Królewskich), the chairperson of which was his friend, Brunon Gabrylewicz. In Wrocław, he found Florian Ceynowa's doctoral dissertation; he sent it to "Gryf" where it was published. He also got in touch with Father Leon Heyke who was then finishing his doctoral paper in Wrocław. During his studies, he did not stop cooperating with "Gryf" and the Young Kashubians (as they were already then called). However, he was not present at the convention of Young Kashubians during which the Society of Young Kashubians was established on 22 August 1912 in Gdańsk.

=== Professional career and literary work ===
In 1913, after passing higher court clerk examination (egzamin na referendarza sądowego), Karnowski started military service in Toruń. Then, after the outbreak of the war, he landed at the front in East Prussia, where he was injured at the battles of Kruklanki (1914) and Baranowicze (1916). In 1917, he spent all the year in hospital in Poznań, writing, inter alia, the biography of Florian Ceynowa published in "Gryf". Then he was allotted to the Generalkommando of Poznań, the fifth car division, where he served until the outbreak of the Greater Poland Uprising. During the Uprising, he presided over the District Police Headquarters in Poznań (Komenda Obwodowa). In 1919, he was transferred to the 2nd Division in Wągrowiec, then to Gniezno, and then back to Poznań – to the Main Military Court (Główny Sąd Wojskowy) where he was upgraded to the position of captain.

After the war, in 1920 he worked in Toruń at the position of the chairperson of the State Police Headquarters for the Pomeranian Voivodeship (Komenda Policji Państwowej na województwo pomorskie). That year, he became the chairperson of the Security Section in the Division of the First Council of the Pomeranian Voivodeship in Toruń (I Urząd Województwa Pomorskiego). He was socially very active, inter alia, as: a member of the Honorary Committee of the Exhibition of Pomeranian Artists in Grudziądz (Komitet Honorowy Wystawy Artystów Pomorskich) and of the Society of Pomeranian Artists in Grudziądz (Towarzystwo Artystów Pomorskich), a member of the board – a librarian, the custodian of the Scientific Society in Toruń (Towarzystwo Naukowe), a cofounder of the Pomeranian Fraternity (Bractwo Pomorskie) (1921), the organiser of the Convention of Polish Philomates (Zjazd Filomatów Polskich) (1921), and the chairperson of the Association of Pomeranian Philomates (Związek Filomatów Polskich) (1923).

In 1923, he was given a decree of nomination for a judge in the Regional Court of Toruń (Sąd Okręgowy), but as early as on 8 October that year, he was transferred to Czersk, where he was supposed to perform the duties of the chairperson of the Poviat Division in Chojnice (Oddział Powiatowy). Two years later, he came back to Toruń, working as a lawyer (advocate). There, he took up editing "Mestwin"—a literary and scientific addition to "Słowo Pomorskie". In 1927, he was given nomination for the Regional Judge (Sędzia Okręgowy) in Chojnice, where he worked for the next 10 years. In Chojnice, he was extremely active when it comes to public life, inter alia, in the Poviat Council (Sejmik Powiatowy), the Polish Tourist Society (Polskie Towarzystwo Krajoznawcze), the Toruń Society for Research on the History of the Independence Movement in Pomerania (Towarzystwo Badań Historii Ruchu Niepodległościowego na Pomorzu), and the Society of the Lovers of Chojnice and its Surroundings (Towarzystwo Miłośników Chojnic i Okolicy).

=== The last years ===
In 1937, he retired and moved to Krostkowo nad Notecią to live with his sister, Elżbieta. Due to his bad health condition, he landed in hospital in Wyrzysk, where he died on 2 October 1939. He was buried in Krostkowo and on 11 December 1947 his ashes were solemnly laid in Brusy.

== Legacy ==
Karnowski was a supporter and promoter of the Kashubian language. He claimed that the Polish culture would prevail Baltic only if it drew on truly Kashubian elements, referred to the old historical traditions and built up with the Kashubian spirit. As a poet, he debuted at the age of 24 (in 1910), publishing "Nowotné spiéwë" under the nom de plume "Wôś Budzysz". That debut turned out to be successful as it presented completely new threads in the Kashubian poetry. Apart from poetry, Jan Karnowski was a columnist and a journalist; he wrote for "Gryf" and for "Mestwin" that he himself issued; he criticised politicians and careerists who exploited Kashubians.

It is regarded that while Majkowski was the creator and leader of the Young Kashubians movement, Karnowski theoretically and academically supported and popularised it. As a Young Kashubians activist, he formed various circles and organisations, and became a writer of historical, ethnological and, poetic texts.

== Patronage ==
As he was a person who rendered especially great service to Kashubia and Pomerania, named after him were, inter alia, streets in Gdańsk, Sopot and Szczecin (Wosia Budzysza); a road interchange at a point of Trasa Sucharskiego; a monument in Brusy (1986); an obelisk in front of a house in Czarnowo; and commemorative plaques in Chojnice (1964), Krostkowo (2006) and Czersk. Also, the Chojnice Primary School No. 7 (Szkoła Podstawowa nr 7) and the Brusy Culture Centre (Gminny Ośrodek Kultury) are named after him. With reference to calling him "the ideological guardian of Mestwin II's testament" ("stróż ideowy testamentu Mściwoja"), a commemorative plaque was placed in the building of the Court in Chojnice to pay homage to Karnowski.

On 30 October 2009, in a garden in his hometown, a monument was unveiled. The monument was made of a huge stone found on the family's field. On the stone, a plaque has been put with a carved likeness of J. Karnowski and an inscription: "Here, Jan Karnowski was born (16 May 1886 – 2 October 1939), an ideologist of the Young Kashubians movement, a writer and a regionalist. At the 70th anniversary of his death, this memorial was erected by grateful and proud of his life achievements [a griffin carved] Zaboracy and Gochowie. Czarnowo, 2 October 2009."

In 2010, the Kashubian-Pomeranian Association declared the year of Jan Karnowski.

== Artistic works (selected items) ==
- Nowotné spiéwë (Poznań 1910)
- Dr. Florian Ceynowa (1917, Gdańsk 1997, Oficyna Czec)
- Muza kaszubska powojenna (Toruń 1925 in: Mestwin, I / 1925, No. 1 i 2)
- Gryf powojenny (Toruń 1927 in: Mestwin, III / 1927, No. 2)
- Z Piśmiennictwa kaszubskiego (Bydgoszcz 1937 in: Dodatek jubileuszowy Dziennika Bydgoskiego, 1937 / No. 286)
- Nowotné spiéwë i wiersze (Gdynia 1958)
- Utwory sceniczne (Gdańsk 1970)
- Wiersze pierwotne (Gdańsk 1978)
- Moja droga kaszubska (Gdańsk 1981)
- Sowizdrzôł u Krëbanów (Gdańsk 1983)
- Jo bëm leno chcôł... (Gdańsk 1986)

== Bibliography ==
- Pomorze Gdańskie 4, literatura i język. Gdańsk 1967.
- Bolduan T., Nowy bedeker kaszubski, Gdańsk 2002.
- Borzyszkowski J., Jan Karnowski (1886–1939), [in:] "Ludzie Pomorza lat 1920–1939, series: "Pomorze Gdańskie", 11, Gdańsk 1977.
- Tenże, Jan Karnowski wśród Kaszubologów, "Pomerania", no. 4.
- Tenże, Jan Karnowski, [in:] "Słownik Biograficzny Pomorza Nadwiślańskiego", 2, Gdańsk 1994.
- Borzyszkowski J., Obracht – Prondzyński C., Ludzie Czerska i okolicy XIX i XX wieku, Gdańsk – Czersk 2007.
- Borzyszkowski J., Obracht – Prondzyński C., Młodokaszubi. Szkice biograficzne, Gdańsk 2012.
- Bukowski A., Regionalizm kaszubski. Ruch naukowy, literacki i kulturalny. Zarys monografii historycznej, Poznań 1950.
- Majkowska D., Podgóreczny J., Jan Karnowski, [in:] "Polski Słownik Biograficzny", 12, Wrocław – Warsaw – Kraków 1966–1967.
- Obracht – Prondzyński C., Jan Karnowski (1886–1939). Pisarz, polityk i kaszubsko-pomorski działacz regionalny, Gdańsk 1999.
- http://szkolnictwo.net/patron,,37075,,jan-karnowski.html
