= Kartuzy =

Kartuzy Kartëzë (Kashubian)
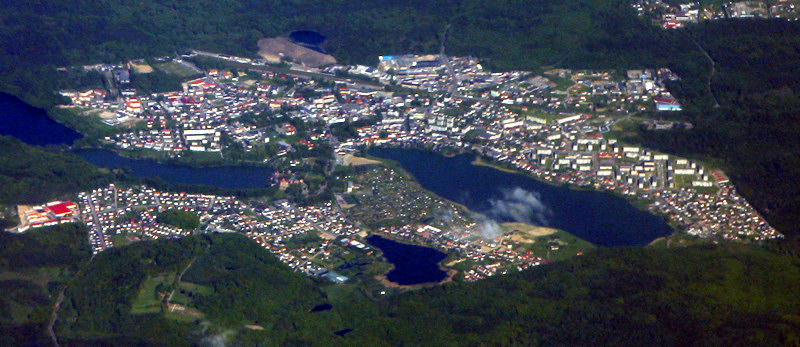
- Kartuzy from a bird's-eye view

- Flag Coat of arms

- Location within Poland
- Coordinates: 54°20′N 18°12′E
- Country: Poland
- Voivodeship: Pomeranian
- County: Kartuzy
- Gmina: Kartuzy
- Established: 1381
- Town rights: 1923

Government
  - Mayor: Mieczysław Gołuński

Area
  - Total: 6.23 km^{2} (2.41 sq mi)
- Elevation: 42 m (138 ft)

Population (2006)
  - Total: 15,263
  - Density: 2,450/km^{2} (6,350/sq mi)
- Time zone: UTC+1 (CET)
  - Summer (DST): UTC+2 (CEST)
- Postal code: 83-300
- Area code: +48 58
- Car plates: GKA
- Website: www.kartuzy.pl

Kartuzy (Polish: [karˈtuzɨ]; Kashubian: Kartùzë, Kartëzë or Kartuzé; former German: Karthaus) is a town in northern Poland, located in the historic Eastern Pomerania (Pomerelia) region. It is the capital of Kartuzy County in Pomeranian Voivodeship.

== Geographical location ==
Kartuzy is located about 32 kilometres (20 miles) west of Gdańsk and 35 km (22 miles) south-east of the town of Lębork on a plateau at an altitude of approximately 200 metres (656 feet) above sea level in the average. The plateau, which is divided by the Radaune lake, comprises the highest parts of the Baltic Sea Plate. In the west of this lake are the highest points of the headwaters of rivers Łeba, Słupia and Bukowina at an altitude of up to 271 metres (889 feet). A hill in the south of the lake is 331 metres (1,086 feet) high.

== History ==
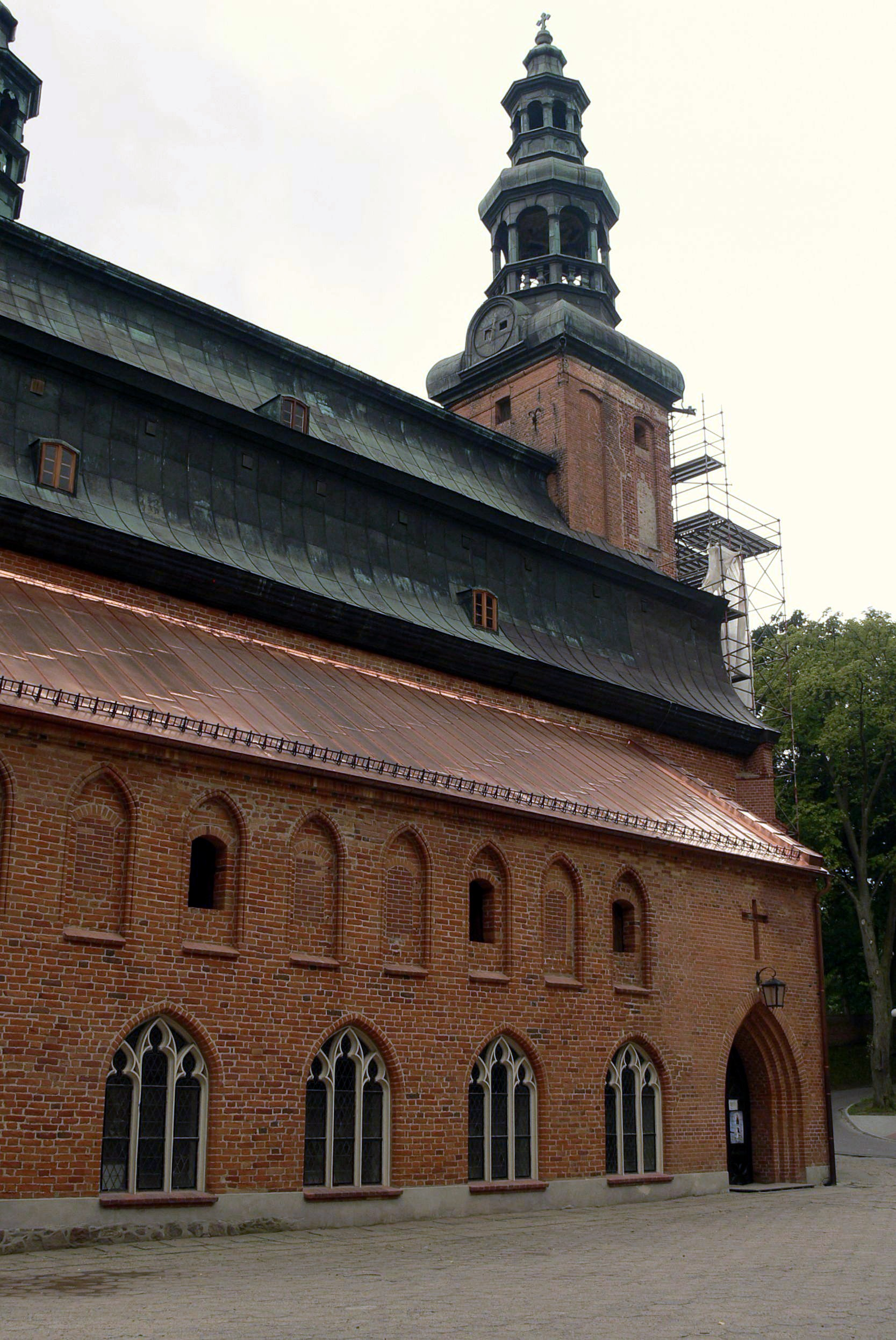
Carthusian Church

Kartuzy was established about 1380 as a monastery for Carthusian monks descending from Prague in the Kingdom of Bohemia, after whom it received its name. The charterhouse was vested with large estates by the State of the Teutonic Order. According to the Second Peace of Thorn the area returned to the Kingdom of Poland in 1466, within which it was administratively part of the Pomeranian Voivodeship in the provinces of Royal Prussia and Greater Poland.

The Carthusian monks had the nearby woodlands cleared out, and peasants from the neighbouring Duchy of Pomerania were encouraged to settle and farm in the newly cleared areas. During the course of the Protestant Reformation Kartuzy and its surrounding area were incorporated into the possessions of Cistercian Oliwa Abbey in 1565. The area was annexed by Prussia in the First Partition of Poland in 1772.

The Prussian government finally dissolved the monastery in 1826. Around that time the settlement was fairly insignificant. It began to play a greater economic role after 1841 when the lands of the monastery were parcelled out.

From 1871 to 1920 it was also part of the German Empire and belonged to the Karthaus district in Regierungsbezirk Danzig in the Prussian Province of West Prussia. In 1894, Kartuzy, then officially Karthaus, was connected to the Praust (Pruszcz Gdański)-Lauenburg (Lębork) railway line of the Prussian State Railway. At the turn of the 20th century, the town had a Protestant church, a Catholic church and a synagogue. The town was appreciated as a climatic type of health resort. Many pensioners and other retired persons settled down here. According to the census of 1910, Karthuas had a population of 3,699, of which 1,937 (52.4%) were Germans, 1,696 (45.9%) were Kashubians and 50 (1.4%) were Poles.

When after World War I the regulations of the Treaty of Versailles became effective in 1920, Kartuzy was reintegrated into the re-established Polish Republic where it was the seat of the Kartuzy County within the Pomeranian Voivodeship and in 1923 it was granted town rights.

After the invasion of Poland, which started World War II, Kartuzy was occupied by Germany, where it was administered as part of the newly formed province of Reichsgau Danzig-West Prussia, Regierungsbezirk Danzig. In mid-September 1939 the SS Wachsturmbann "Eimann" and Einsatzkommando 16 entered the town to carry out mass arrests and massacres of local Poles as part of the Intelligenzaktion Pommern. Around 4,000 Poles from Kartuzy and the county were arrested in September 1939. That same month, many local pre-war Polish activists, as well as railway, post and court employees, were murdered in massacres in the forests in Gmina Somonino and at the Wzgórze Wolności, while 10 Polish priests were murdered in the forest near Kartuzy (see: Nazi persecution of the Catholic Church in Poland). Dozens of Poles from Kartuzy, including local officials, teachers, merchants, postmen, restaurateurs, policemen were murdered in October and November 1939 in the nearby forest and in Piaśnica. Poles from the village of Egiertowo were also murdered in the Kartuzy forest. At the end of World War II Kartuzy was captured by the Red Army and afterwards it was restored to Poland.

Kartuzy has long been a cultural center of the Kashubians. Since 1947 a Kashubian Museum has featured numerous exhibits connected to Kashubia and its inhabitants. The town has also set up a bust to honor Dr. Aleksander Majkowski, author of The Life and Adventures of Remus, who practiced medicine in Kartuzy for a time and is buried here. In 2010, the Kashubian Unity Day was held here. On March 28, 2010, after the Holy Mass in the fourteenth-century collegiate church, Kashubes in colorful regional costumes with black-and-yellow flags passed through the streets to the Team of Schools No. 2 for Wybicki's Estate where the main celebrations were held.

The town was administratively part of the Gdańsk Voivodeship from 1975 to 1998.

== Coat of arms ==
Selected sights of Kartuzy

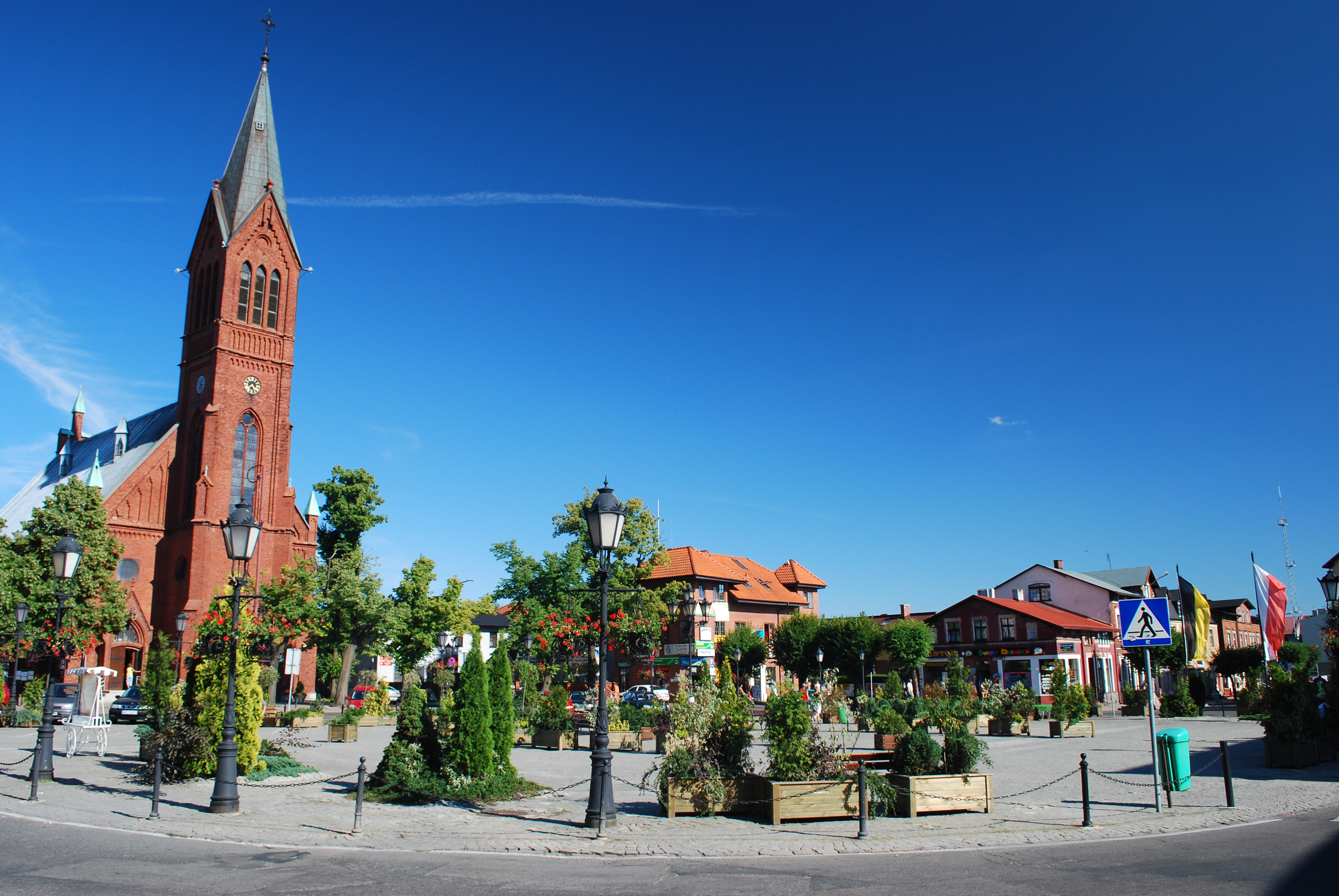
Market square and St. Casimir's Church

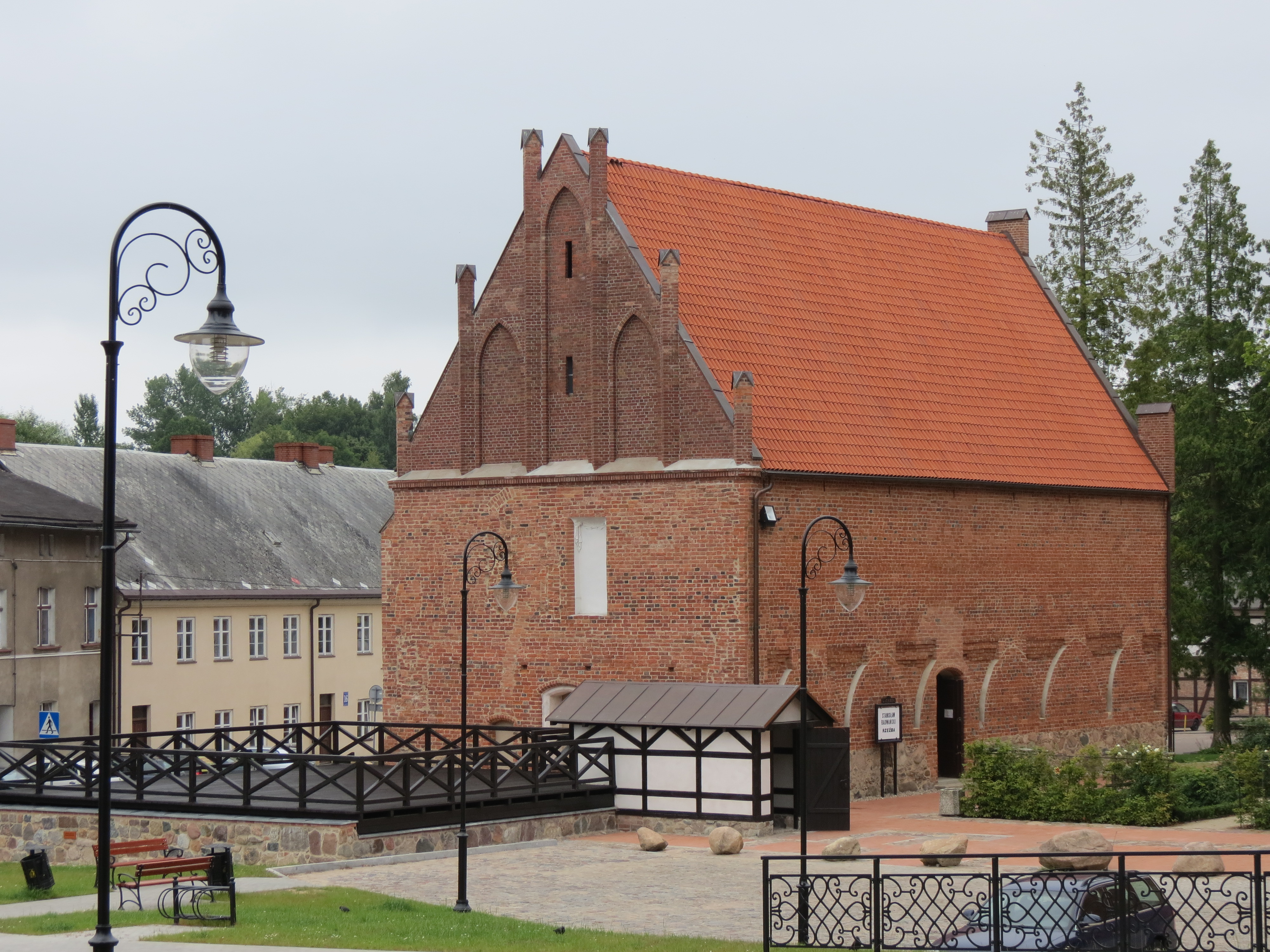
Refectory of the Carthusian monastery

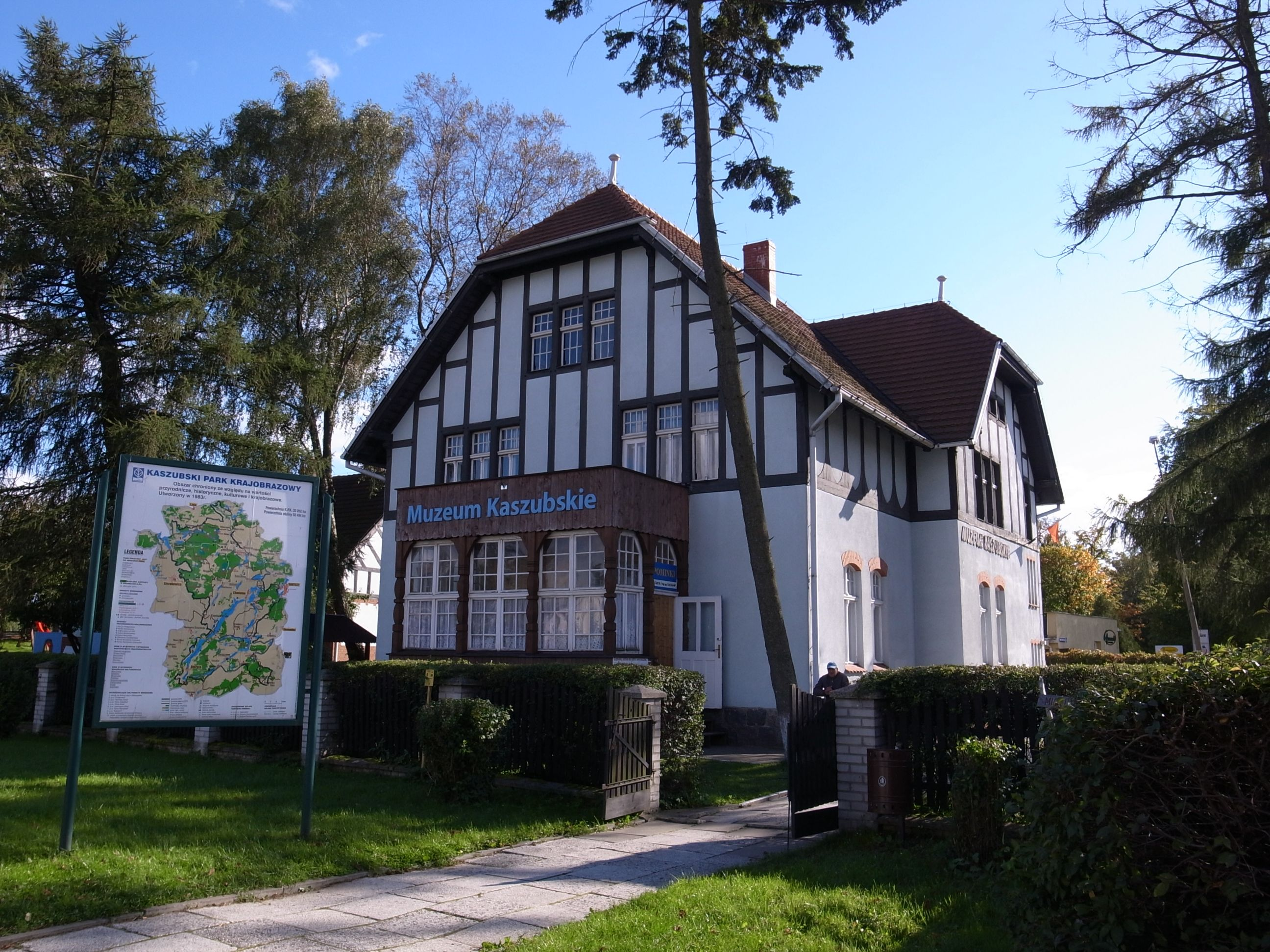
Kashubian Museum

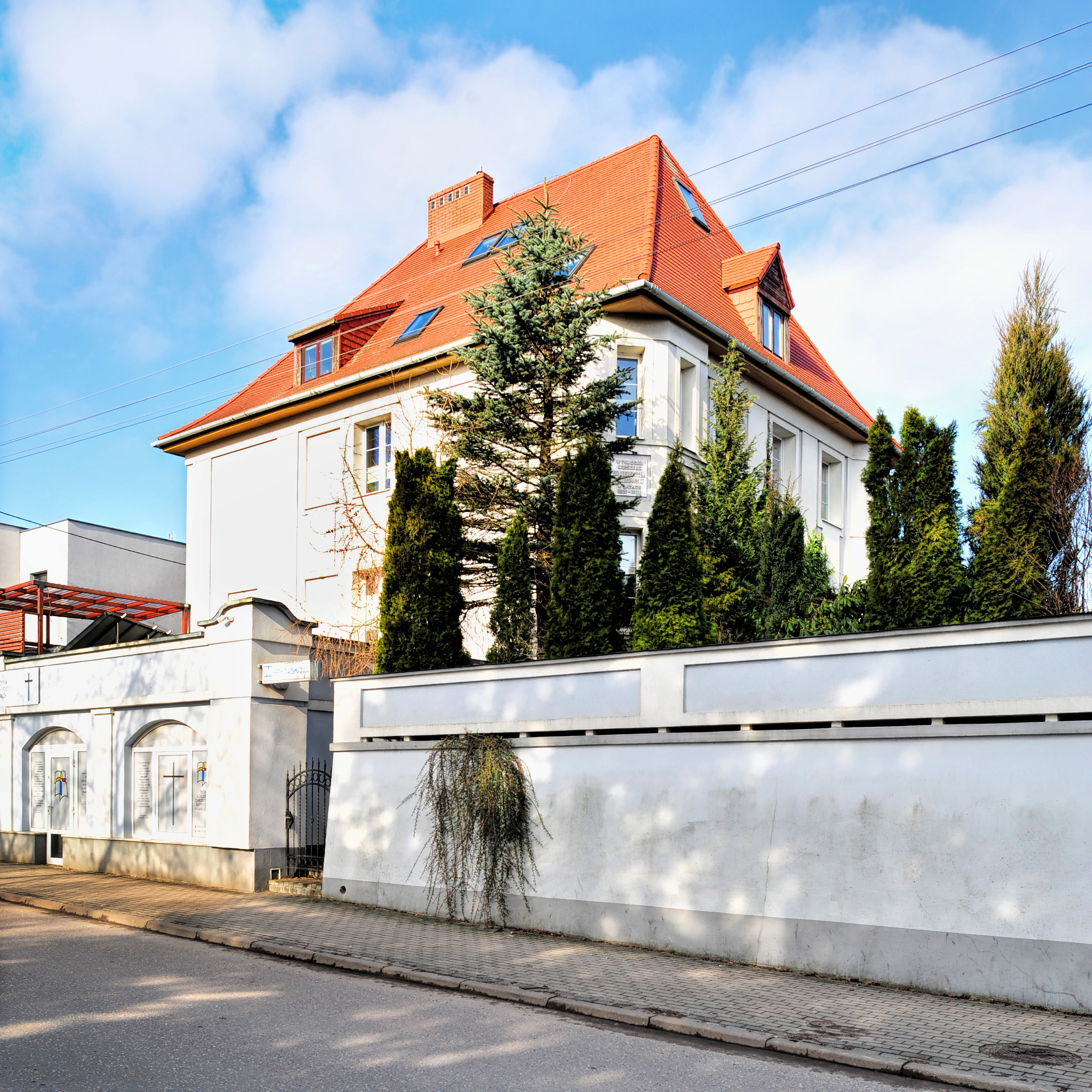
Home of Aleksander Majkowski

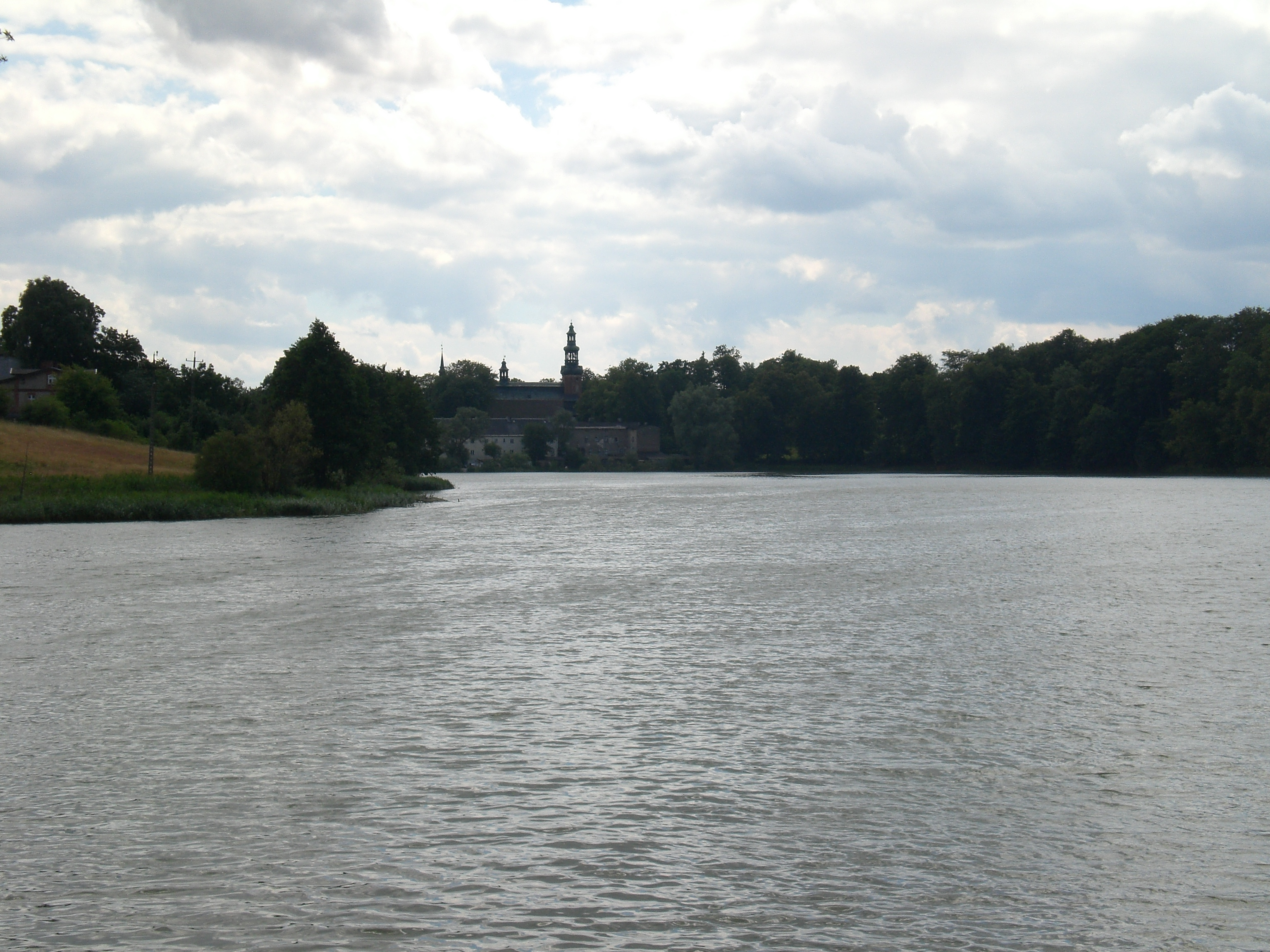
Klasztorne Małe Lake

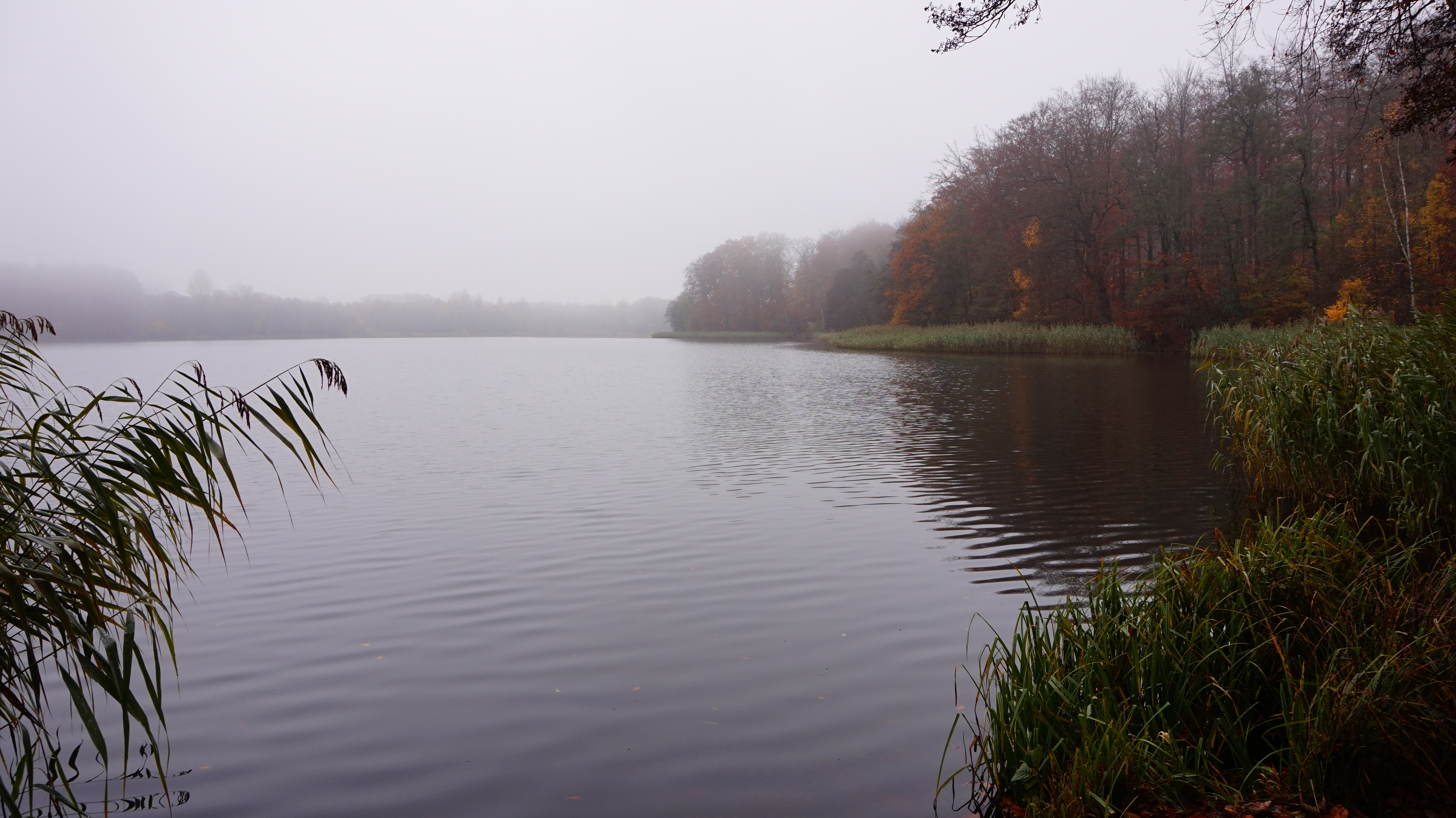
Klasztorne Duże Lake

A coat of arms for Kartuzy was designed by Aleksander Majkowski and accepted by the city council on January 31, 1923. The coat of arms depicts a black Kashubian Griffin and seven silver stars on a blue background.

== Population by year ==
Year	Number	Remarks
1831	more than 400	
1869	1,765	
1875	1,975	
1880	2,179	
1885	2,300	
1890	2,351	
1895	2,377	
1900	2,642	
1921	3,800	
1943	6,024	
1960	7,900	
1970	10,600	
1975	11,600	
1980	12,000	
1998	16,100	
2004	15,472	
2009	14,951	

- Note that the above table is based on primary, possibly inaccurate or biased sources.

== Sports ==
The local football club is Cartusia Kartuzy, founded in 1923. It competes in the lower leagues.

== Notable people ==
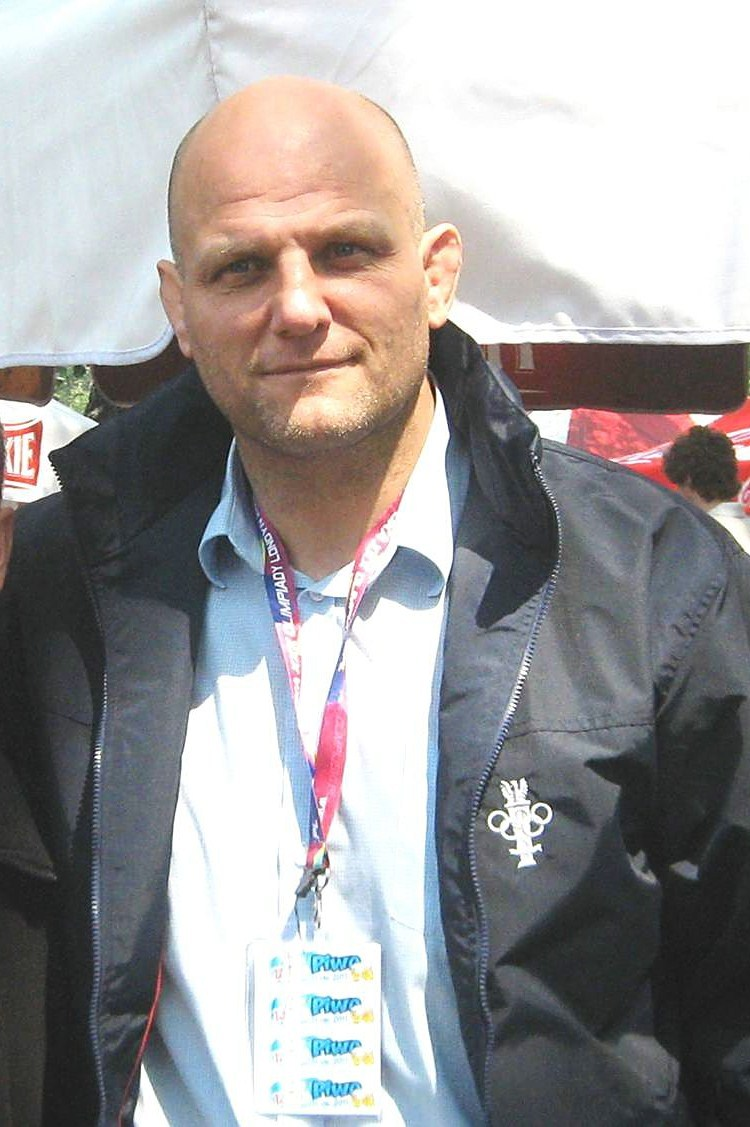
Andrzej Wronski

- Aleksander Majkowski (1876–1938), writer, poet, journalist, editor, activist and physician
- Jan Rompsczi (1913–1969), activist, poet, writer, journalist and ethnographer
- Andrzej Wroński (born 1965), Greco-Roman style wrestler, gold medallist at the 1988 and 1996 Summer Olympics, carried the flag at the opening ceremony of the 2000 Summer Olympics
- Wojciech Kasperski (born 1981), screenwriter, film director and producer
- Piotr Chrapkowski (born 1988), handball player
- Angelika Cichocka (born 1988), middle-distance athlete
- Martyna Byczkowska (born 1995), actress
- Szymon Sajnok (born 1997), road and track cyclist

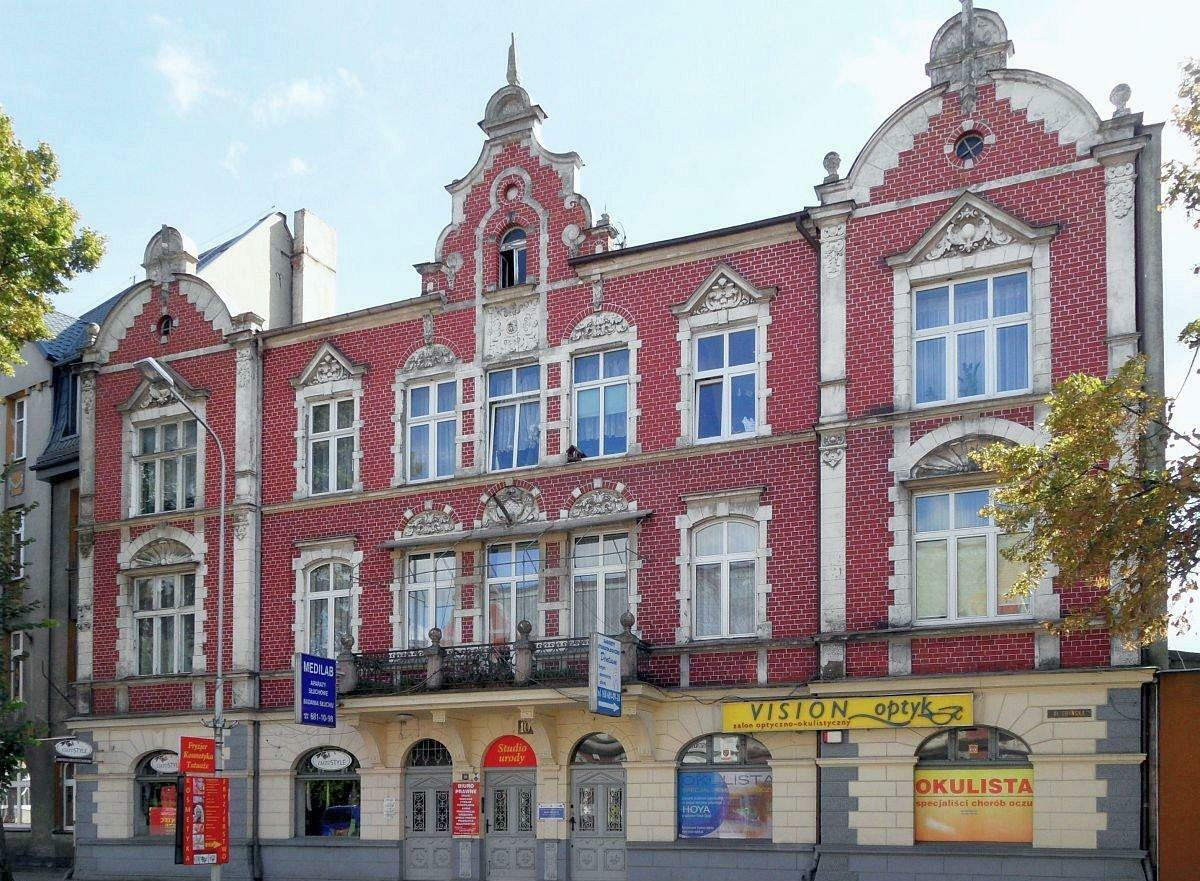
Gdańsk Street

== International relations ==
Kartuzy is twinned with:

Caissargues, France	Duderstadt, Germany
