= Cierżnia =

- Settlement
- Location within Poland
- Coordinates: 54°30′38″N 18°18′5″E
- Country: Poland
- Voivodeship: Pomeranian
- County: Wejherowo
- Gmina: Wejherowo

Cierżnia [ˈt͡ɕɛrʐɲa] is a settlement in the administrative district of Gmina Wejherowo, within Wejherowo County, Pomeranian Voivodeship, in northern Poland.

For details of the history of the region, see History of Pomerania.
