= Kashubian Griffin =

Polish anti-nazi organization

The Kashubian Griffin, full name Secret Military Organization "Kashubian Griffin", (Polish: Tajna Organizacja Wojskowa "Gryf Kaszubski", Kashubian: Krëjamnô Wòjskòwô Òrganizacjô "Kaszëbsczi Grif") was a Kashubian anti-Nazi organization during World War II in Gdańsk Pomerania - Kashubia. It was active between December 1939 and the summer of 1941, when it became part of the more general Pomeranian Griffin.

== Literature ==
- G. Stone: Slav outposts in Central European history : the Wends, Sorbs and Kashubs, London, UK : Bloomsbury Academic, an imprint of Bloomsbury Publishing Plc, 2016, s. 341
