= Leon Heyke =

Kashubian Roman Catholic priest, poet, and activist

- Léón Heyke
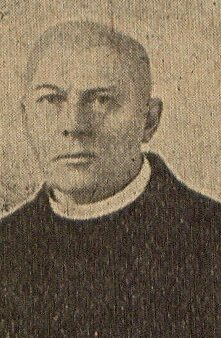
- Born: October 10, 1885; Cérzniô, German Empire
- Died: October 15, 1939 (aged 54); Forest of Szpęgawsk
- Other name: Stanisław Czernicki
- Occupation: Priest
- Years active: 1910–1939
- Known for: Kashubian activist

Leon Heyke (Kashubian: Léón Hejka) (10 October 1885—15 October 1939) was a Roman Catholic priest, theologian, educator, poet and Kashubian-Polish activist.

== Biography ==
Heyke was born on 10 October 1885 in the Kashubian village of Cierżnia, in Wejherowo County.

Father Heyke was ordained a Roman Catholic priest on 13 March 1910 in Pelplin. In 1913 he completed his doctorate in theology with a dissertation on the letters of Saint John. During this time he traveled widely throughout Kashubia, particularly through the northern part, gathering information about Kashubian culture and language. Although he was associated with the Society of Young Kashubians from its start, he gradually distanced himself from the Society's cultural objectives and focused on his priestly vocation and his poetry, which he published under the pen name Stanisław Czernicki.

When Poland regained its freedom after the First World War, Father Heyke was based from 1920 to 1935 in Kościerzyna, where he served as chaplain and teacher of religion and French at the National Gimnazjum. He resumed his prolific publication of poetry and historical works, preferring to emphasize northern variants of the Kashubian language. In addition, he became known as one of the leading Kashubian activists. Among other things, he was the featured speaker at the 1931 dedication of the monument to Hieronim Derdowski in Wiele.

After the German invasion of Poland on 1 September 1939, Father Heyke attempted to join the Polish Army as a chaplain. However, he was arrested by the Germans in the Kociewian town of Wda and executed with other clergy and intellectuals on 15 October in the Szpęgawski Forest near Starogard Gdański.

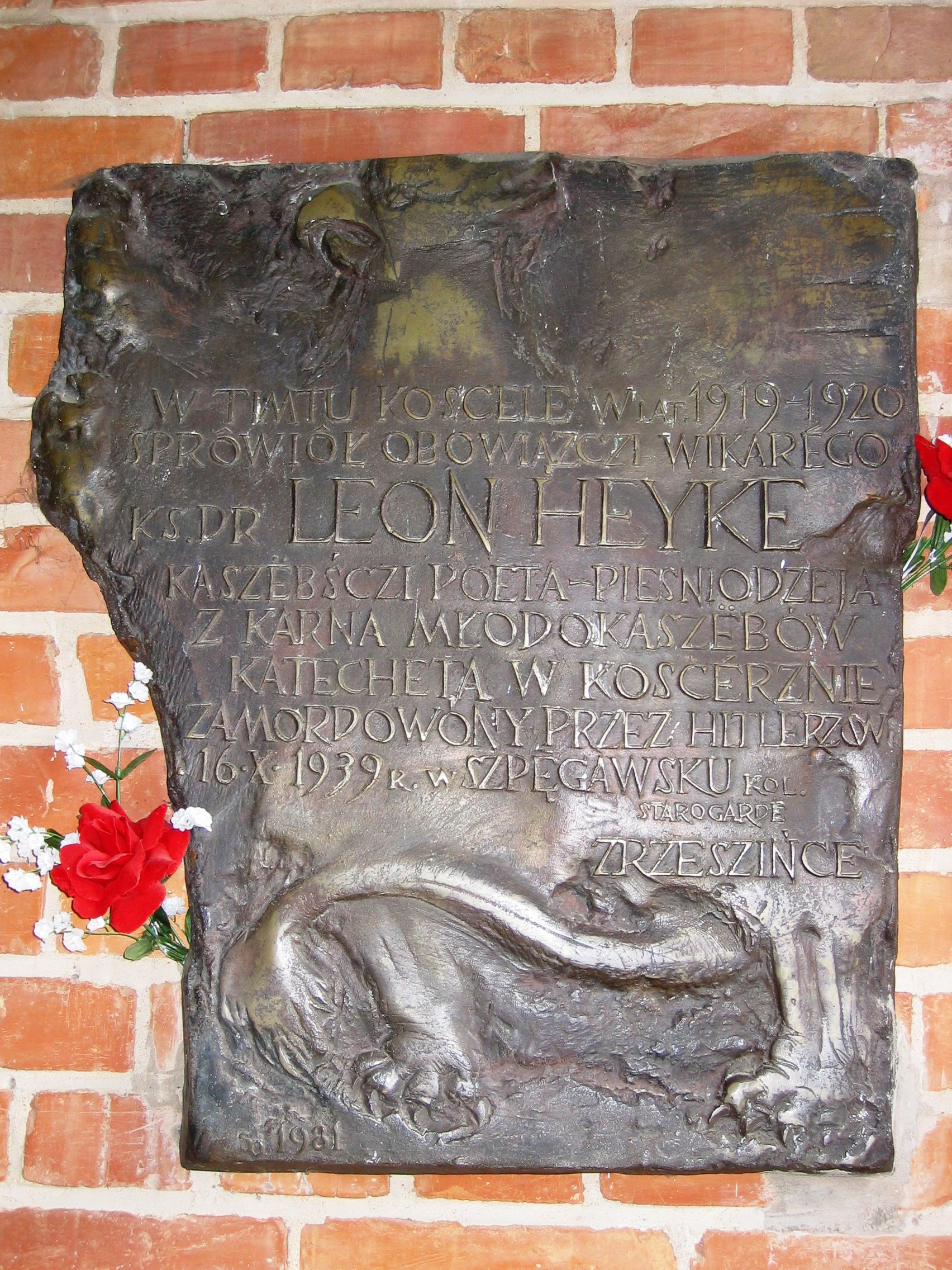
The monument to Heyke in Wygoda Łączyńska

Although Father Heyke's works were rarely published during the period of Communist rule, his life and writings now enjoy a renewed recognition in Kashubian culture. In 2005 the Kashubian Institute of Gdańsk sponsored a conference on Father Heyke entitled Świętopełk literatury kaszubskiej (The Swietopelk of Kashubian Literature), in reference to the revered Kashubian historical figure Swietopelk II, Duke of Pomerania. The conference proceedings have been published under the same title.

== Works ==
- Piesnie północny, 1911-1912
- Die Moraltheologie der sieben apokalyptischen Sendschreiben, Gdańsk 1913
- Bardzenskji wergle, 1922-1923
- Kaszëbski Spiewe, Chojnice 1927
- Wojewoda, cz. II, Toruń 1928
- Podania kaszubskie, Kościerzyna 1931
- Zarys dziejów i działalności Państwowego Seminarium Nauczycielskiego Męskiego w Kościerzynie, Kościerzyna 1935
- Sfinks kaszubski, 1935
- Agust Szloga, Kartuzy 1935
- Katilina, Kartuzy 1937
- Kaszëbsczié spiewë, Gdańsk-Wejherowo 1972, 1978
- Dobrogòst i Miłosława, Gdańsk 1999
- Kaszëbsczé spiewë, Gdańsk 1999
- Szôłôbùłki. Agùst Szlôga, Katilina, Gdańsk 2002

== Bibliography ==
- A. Bukowski, Regionalizm kaszubski. Ruch naukowy, literacki i kulturalny. Zarys monografii historycznej, Poznań 1950
- L. Bądkowski, Zarys historii literatury kaszubskiej, Gdańsk 1959, 2006
- R. Ostrowska, I. Trojanowska, Bedeker kaszubski, Gdańsk 1962, 1974, 1979
- F. Neureiter, Geschichte der kaschubischen Literatur, München 1978, 1991; in Polish: Historia literatury kaszubskiej. Próba zarysu, Gdańsk 1982
- J. Drzeżdżon, Piętno Smętka. Z problemów kaszubskiej literatury regionalnej lat 1920-1939, Gdańsk 1973
- H. Popowska-Taborska, Kaszubszczyzna. Zarys dziejów, Warszawa 1980
- Słownik biograficzny Pomorza Nadwiślańskiego, vol. 3, Gdańsk 1992, 1997 (entry Heyke, author: A. Bukowski)
- B. Bork, Piesniodzej lesôcczich strón. Ks. dr. Leon Heyke z Cierzni koło Bieszkowic, Bojan 1992
- T. Bolduan, Nowy bedeker kaszubski, Gdańsk 1997, 2002
- R. Osowicka, Bedeker wejherowski, Gdańsk-Wejherowo 1997, 2002, Wejherowo 2006
- St. Janke, Poeta z kaszubskiej nocy. Życie i twórczość ks. dr. Leona Heykego (1885-1939) , Wejherowo 1998
- J. Treder i in., Historia, geografia, język i piśmiennictwo Kaszubów, J. Borzyszkowski, J. Mordawski, J. Treder - J. Bòrzëszkòwsczi, J. Mòrdawsczi, J. Tréder: Historia, geògrafia, jãzëk i pismienizna Kaszëbów; pòd red. Jana Mòrdawsczégò, tołmaczënk Jerzi Tréder, Wëdowizna M. Rôżok przë wespółrobòce z Institutã Kaszëbsczim, Gduńsk 1999, ISBN 83-86608-65-X.
- T. Linkner, W unii słowa, Gdańsk 2004
- J. Kęcińska, Leon Heyke - Świętopełk literatury kaszubskiej, Gdańsk-Wejherowo 2007
- R. Osowicka, Leksykon wejherowian, Wejherowo 2008
