= Czarna Dąbrowa, Bytów County =

Czarna Dąbrowa
- Village
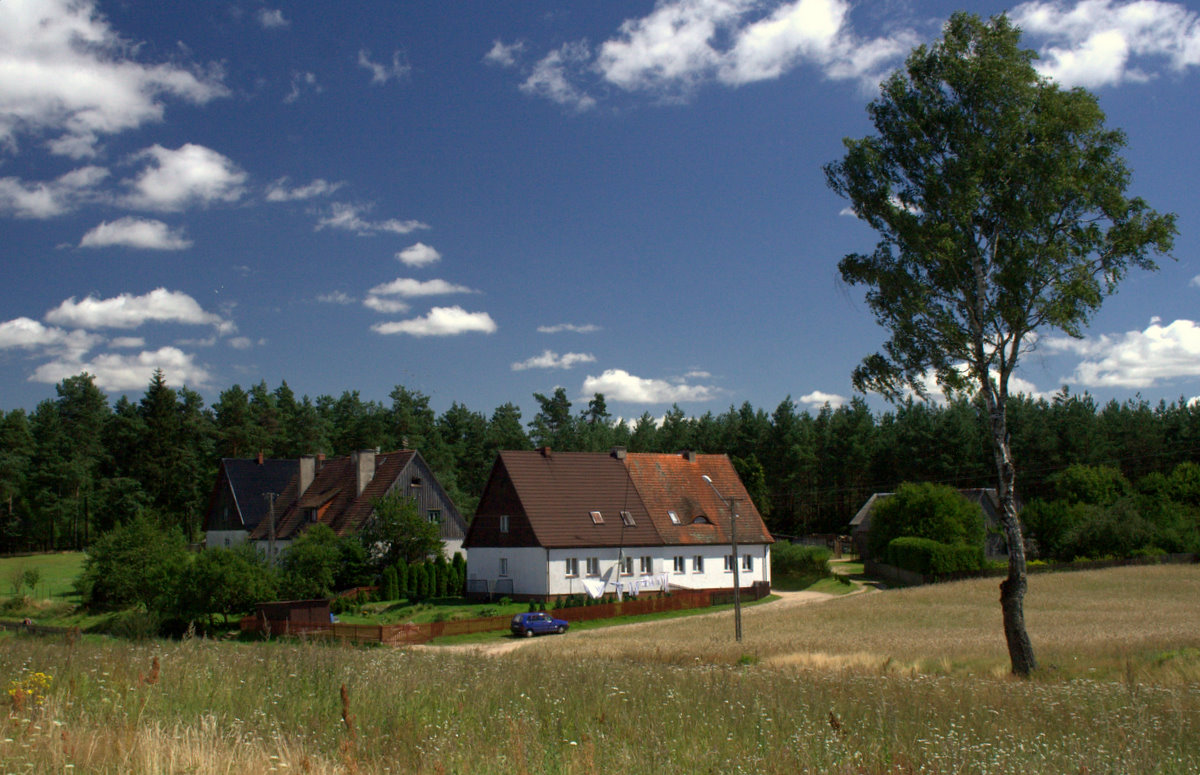
- Houses in Czarna Dąbrowa

- Location within Poland
- Coordinates: 54°07′36″N 17°37′15″E
- Country: Poland
- Voivodeship: Pomeranian
- County: Bytów
- Gmina: Studzienice
- Population (2006): 105

Czarna Dąbrowa [ˈt͡ʂarna dɔmˈbrɔva] (Czarndamerow, 1939-45: Sonnenwalde) is a village in Gmina Studzienice, Bytów County, Pomeranian Voivodeship, in northern Poland.

From 1975 to 1998 the village was in Słupsk Voivodeship.
