= Aleksander Majkowski =

Kashubian writer and activist (1876–1938)

Dr. Aleksander Majkowski
- Aleksander Majkòwsczi
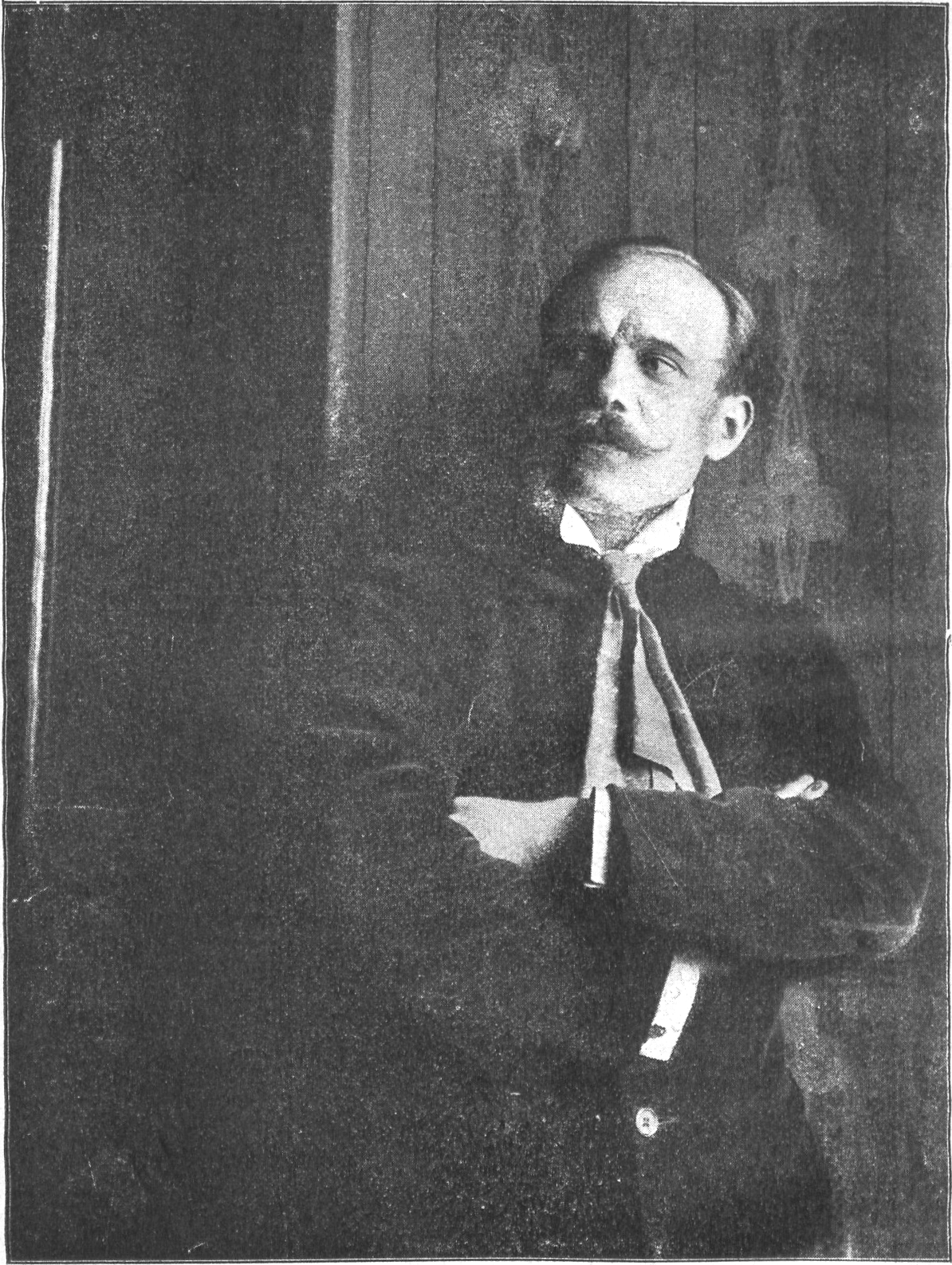
- Born: Aleksander Jan Alojzy Majkowski; July 17, 1876; Kòscérzëna, Prësë
- Died: February 10, 1938 (aged 61); Gdiniô, Pòlskô
- Resting place: Kartuzë
- Education: Berlin University
- Occupations: Tour guide; Physician; Writer; Editor
- Organization: Zet
- Notable work: The Life and Adventures of Remus
- Political party: Supreme People's Council
- Spouse: Aleksandra Komorowska née Starzyńska
- Children: Damroka; Mestwin; Barbara; Witosława

Aleksander Majkowski (Kashubian: Aleksander Majkòwsczi; 17 July 1876 – 10 February 1938) was a Polish-Kashubian writer, poet, journalist, editor, activist, and physician. He was the most important figure in the Kashubian movement before World War II, editor of Gryf, author of the greatest Kashubian novel The Life and Adventures of Remus, and Historia Kaszubów (The History of the Kashubs).

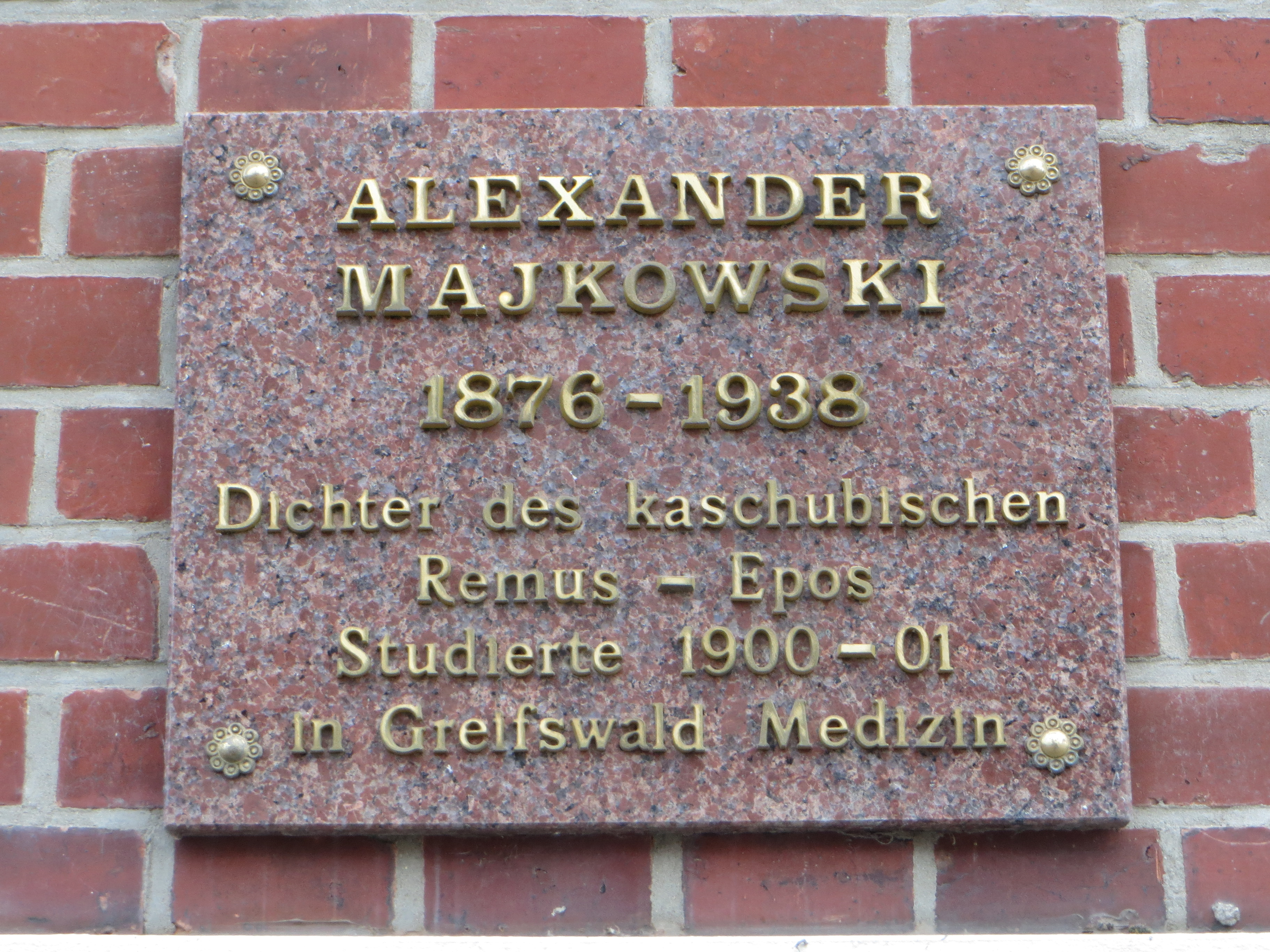
Plaque of Aleksander Majkowski in Greifswald, Germany

== Early life ==
Aleksander Jan Alojzy Majkowski was born into a farming family on July 17, 1876, in what was then Berent, West Prussia, Prussian partition of Poland, the eldest child of two sisters and three brothers. In Berent, he completed primary school (Volksschule) and in 1885-90 attended a German progymnasium. He was given a scholarship of Towarzystwo Pomocy Naukowej (Society of Educational Aid), based in Chełmno (then Culm). In 1891, he began his education in a gymnasium in Konitz, living in a convent there. Also there, he became acquainted with Polish literature and history. In 1895, he earned his matriculation certificate. At first, he meant to study theology to become a priest, but instead he enrolled at the Berlin University and in 1897, began studying medicine. In Berlin, he became involved in social activities; for example, he gave lectures for Poles who lived there.

=== Early influences ===
In 1898, he took part in the ceremony of the erection of Adam Mickiewicz's monument in Warsaw and was reminded of his Slavic identity. In 1899, he published his poem Pielgrzymka Wejherowska ("The Wejherowo Pilgrimage") and satire Jak w Koscérznie koscelnygo obrele, abo Pięc kawalerów a jedna jedyno brutka ("How in Kościerzyna they chose the sacristan or Five bridegrooms and only one bride").

In 1900, Majkowski moved to Greifswald to continue his studies. There he got involved in the agenda of an early Polish socialist organization called Zet, and a local student society called "Adelphia". Because he also tried to establish his own political organization, in 1901, he was relegated from the university. Later on, he moved to Munich to continue his studies there. Aside from regular curriculum, he carried on with his earlier established cultural interests and worked for Towarzystwo Studentów Polaków (Society of Polish Students) and founded the "Vistula" society. In 1903, he finally completed his studies and moved to Zurich, Switzerland, where he wrote his doctoral dissertation on blood cells in plumbism. In September 1904, he defended his Medical Doctor (MD) degree and, at the end of the year, returned to Kashubia. In Gdańsk, he fulfilled his year-long medical practicum at a local hospital. With immense energy, he decided to get involved in the cultural and social activities in the area.

== Professional career ==
In 1905, he accepted a position of chief editor of "Gazeta Gdańska" ("The Gdańsk Gazette") and its supplement "Drużba. Pismo dlö polscich Kaszubów" ("Friendship. Magazine for Polish Kashubs"). Meanwhile, in Poznań, he published a selection of his Kashubian language poems Spiewe i frantówci ("Songs and merry verses"). At that time, he also prepared the re-editions of Hieronim Derdowski's poems Jasiek z Knieji ("Johnny from Knieja", i.e., the forest) and Kaszubi pod Widnem ("The Kashubs near Widno"). In 1906, he returned to his native Kościerzyna, where he opened a private practice while continuing his involvement in the cultural and social spheres, e.g. in a venture "Dom Kaszubski" ("The Kashubian House") and Towarzystwo Czytelni Polskiej (Polish Reading Room Society) that he had set up. He is also actively involved in Towarzystwo Wyborcze (Electional Society), Towarzystwo Śpiewacze (Singing Society) "Halka", and Związek Młodych Kupców (Young Merchants' Union). During this time, he cooperated with Izydor Gulgowski, Friedrich Lorentz, and the German Verein für Kaschubische Volkskunde (Society for Kashubian Folk Studies). While studying the folklore of the region, he did not forsake publishing in Gazeta Gdańska.

Between 1908-12, Majkowski continued to publish in Kościerzyna and, starting in 1911 in Gdańsk, a monthly entitled "Gryf. Pismo dla spraw kaszubskich" ("Griffin. Magazine for the Kashubian issues"). Concurrently, he initiated other Kashubian cultural and political programs and began gathering Kashubian intelligentsia around himself. In parallel, he took part in many cultural activities that promote Kashubia. He immortalized the Black Griffin as the emblem of the Kashubians. The Kashubian Griffin became the symbol of the strength and steadfastness of the Kashubian people also in Canada.

He organized a Kashubian-Pomeranian exhibition, singlehandedly writing all of the supporting printed material for it. However, not only did he write a lot, but also he travelled extensively, taking many pictures. As a pedagogist, he remained in consistent touch with students; encouraging them to explore Kashubia; he offered himself as a tour guide. In early 1912, he finally settled in Sopot, continuing to work as a physician until 1921.

=== Society of Young Kashubians ===
A capstone to years of efforts, in June 1912, Aleksander Majkowski managed to set up his Gdańsk-based Towarzystwo Młodokaszubów (The Society of Young Kashubians), established for "the cultural, economical and political development of Kashubia". Another member of this society was the newly ordained Roman Catholic priest Leon Heyke. In September of the following year, he instituted the Kashubian-Pomeranian Museum in Sopot, including the adjacent society, and wrote a guide to Kashubia called Zdroje Raduni ("The Radunia River's Wells"). Recognized for his accomplishments, he sadly encountered opposition from some local social activists and the Catholic Church. Fortunately, he managed to win a defamation court case posed by a catholic magazine "Pielgrzym" (The Pilgrim).

=== Wartime activities ===
In August 1914, Majkowski was drafted into the Prussian Army, where he served as a physician in Poland, Romania and France. During the war, he wrote a diary, sketched for Kashubia's history, and two novels: Pomorzanie ("The Pomeranians", unfinished) and Żëcé i przigodë Remusa ("The Life and Adventures of Remus").

=== Return from the war ===
In July 1918, he returned to Sopot, became politically active, and participated in some military activities taking place in what is now called the Trojmiasto area (Gdansk, Gdynia, Sopot). During the same year, he also became a member of Rada Ludowa (The People's Council). A year later, in Gdańsk, he set up Koło Demokratyczne (Democratic Circle), became chief editor of "Dziennik Gdański" ("The Gdańsk Daily"), and continued teaching at a local folk university. For his military efforts, he earned the rank of captain of the Polish Army, and was later promoted to colonel. In 1920, he sat on the board of the commission responsible for establishing the Polish-German borders and in Rada Pomorska – Towarzystwo Ochrony Polskości na Pomorzu (Pomeranian Council – Society for the Protection of Polish Interests in Pomerania) as its head. For the next two years, he resided in Grudziądz, though he traveled extensively throughout Poland. In Grudziądz, he met his future wife, Aleksandra Starzyńska. Also there, he organized the Exhibition of Fine Arts, having Pomeranian artists in mind, which was officially opened on June 7, 1921, by the head of Poland, Marshall Józef Piłsudski.

In the coming years, Majkowski continued his political and cultural activities aimed at promoting Kashubia and Kashubian culture. He established a drama theater in Toruń, become a leader of Stowarzyszenie Artystów Pomorskich (Society of Pomeranian Artists) based in Grudziądz, and a chief editor of a magazine called "Pomorzanin" ("The Pomeranian") – all this between 1921 and 1923. In addition, during this time he resumed publishing "Gryf", and continued to write, collaborating with various periodicals and radio in Toruń. In "Gryf", he also published the first chapters of his book Żëcé i przigodë Remusa.

=== Marriage ===
On October 6, 1921, in Warsaw, Aleksander Majkowski marries Aleksandra Komorowska (former name: Starzyńska, 1891–1982). The newlywed couple settled in Kartuzy, in a villa called "Erem" (The Hermitage). They paranted four children: Damroka (1922–1979), Mestwin (1924–1944), Barbara (1928–1983) and Witosława (1929–1955). Somehow, in his free time, Majkowski managed to collect stamps and postcards, read detective stories, and go mushroom picking.

=== Continued business activities ===
In Kartuzy, he worked as a physician in a number of places, mainly at the railroad clinics, often volunteering to help people in need, but without neglecting his writing. Attending to his patients on the country side, he kept collecting samples of folklore artifacts and photographs the life of the Kashubs. For his commitment to "social work in Pomerania", Majkowski received the Officer's Cross of the Order of Poland's Restitution, from President Stanisław Wojciechowski in April 1923. A year later, he published his Przewodnik po Szwajcarji Kaszubskiej ("A Guide to the so-called Kashubian Switzerland") and, in 1925, a single issue of "Gryf". Shortly thereafter, he endured yet another round of criticism in being accused of separatism, bolshevism, immorality, crimes, and bad influence on society at large.

== Withdrawal from public affairs ==
Due to recession, personal failures and health problems, Aleksander Majkowski retracted from public life and concentrated on literary work. He patronized the actions of Aleksander Labuda and Jan Trepczyk – young Kashubian activists, who in 1929 establish Zrzeszenie Regionalne Kaszubów (Kashubian Regional Union) in Kartuzy, with Majkowski as its head. Later, he fruitfully and with dedication collaborated with the associated magazine "Zrzesz Kaszëbskô" ("Kashubian Union"). Soon Majkowski also joins Polski Związek Zachodni (Polish Union of the West) and collaborates with Instytut Bałtycki (The Baltic Institute). For his tireless efforts, in 1930, he received The Golden Cross of Merit, one of the most prestigious awards of the Republic of Poland.

Although a member of the board of editors of the revived "Gryf" since October 1931, he did not return to a full-time journalism until 1934. In October 1935, he publishes the first part of his three-part novel Żëcé i przigodë Remusa. He was awarded The Silver Literary Laurel (Srebrny Wawrzyn Literacki) by Polska Akademia Literatury (The Polish Academy of Literature). Meanwhile, in his villa, he organized a folklore exhibition and tries to cure his fatigued health by taking repetitive trips to various spas.

1936 and 1937 were busy years for Majkowski. He worked on Gramatyka kaszubska ("The Kashubian Grammar", incomplete) and Historia Kaszubów ("The History of the Kashubs"). He put a lot of effort into his guide to Kashubia and adapted his satire Jak w Koscérznie koscelnygo obrele... for the theatre under a new title of "Strachë i zrękovjinë" ("Fears and Engagements"). All along, he wrote extensively for the press.

== Death and legacy ==
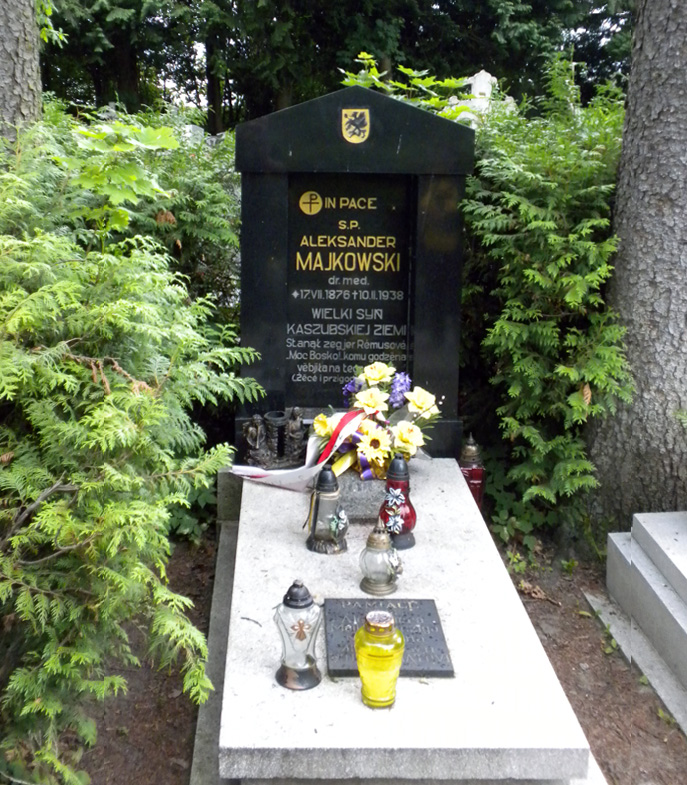
Grave of Dr. Aleksander Majkowski; Kartuzy, Poland.

Aleksander Majkowski died on February 10, 1938, at the hospital in Gdynia of a heart failure. His remains were buried with great ceremony four days later in the cemetery of the Carthusian monastery in Kartuzy. His coffin were escorted by the railroad workers whom he had tended to and the young Kashubian activists who vowed to continue his work.

A few months after Majkowski's death, his Historia Kaszubów and the entire novel Żëcé i przigodë Remusa were published. After the war, Żëcé i przigodë Remusa reappeared on a few occasions and in 1964, was translated into Polish by the Kashubian-Polish writer and activist, Lech Bądkowski. Historia Kaszubów was published with a foreword by the Kaszubian scholar Gerard Labuda. Many of Majkowski's other, less known, writings were also published or republished. For example, his recollections, letters and the war diary were jointly published under a title of Pamiętnik z wojny europejskiej roku 1914 ("The Diary from the European War of the Year 1914").

Aleksander Majkowski is regarded as the leading figure in the Kashubian movement and the founder of its historic and intellectual base. By design, he captured the Kashubian cultural ideology in the literary figure of the humble Kashubian farm laborer Remus (who is not to be confused with the Roman mythological or the American literary figure of the same name). Majkowski also worked to define Kashubian grammar and spelling, promoted protection of historical monuments and regional folklore, set up social and economical Kashubian-Pomeranian institutions, represented the Kashubes on the country's forum and the Slavonic scene. Majkowski was also a translator of German texts into Kashubian language. His multifaceted activity covered all sides of the social life of Kashubia and its impact continues to this day. In Poland, 2008 was declared the year of Aleksander Majkowski.

An English translation of Żëcé i przigodë Remusa, by Blanche Krbechek and Katarzyna Gawlik-Luiken, was published in 2008 by the Kashubian Institute in Gdansk as "Life and Adventures of Remus." The translation "Life and Adventures of Remus" was accomplished under the aegis of the Kashubian Association of North America and can be purchased through the Kashubian Association's website.

There is a street named for his in e.g. Gdańsk.

== See also ==
- Kashubians
- Kashubian language
- Slovincian
- Pomerania

== Bibliography ==
- J. Borzyszkowski, J. Mordawski, J. Treder: Historia, geografia, język i piśmiennictwo Kaszubów; J. Bòrzëszkòwsczi, J. Mòrdawsczi, J. Tréder: Historia, geògrafia, jãzëk i pismienizna Kaszëbów; pòd red. Jana Mòrdawsczégò, tołmaczënk Jerzi Tréder, Wëdowizna M. Rôżok przë wespółrobòce z Institutã Kaszëbsczim, Gduńsk 1999, ISBN 83-86608-65-X.
- Czajkowski M.: Powiat Kartuski : Szwajcaria Kaszubska / Kaszëbskô Szwajcarëjô. Bydgoszcz 2003
- J. Drzeżdżon, "Współczesna literatura kaszubska 1945-1980", Warszawa 1986, ISBN 83-205-3749-5
- G. Stone, Slav outposts in Central European history : the Wends, Sorbs and Kashubs, London, UK : Bloomsbury Academic, an imprint of Bloomsbury Publishing Plc, 2016.
- F. Neureiter: Geschichte der kaschubischen Literatur : Versuch einer zusammenfassenden Darstellung, 2. verb. u. erw. Auflage, Sagner, München 1991, ISBN 3-87690-488-9.
- F. Neureiter: Historia literatury kaszubskiej : próba zarysu, przełożyła Maria Boduszyńska-Borowikowa; wstępem opatrzył Tadeusz Bolduan, Zrzeszenie Kaszubsko-Pomorskie, Oddział Miejski, Gdańsk 1982, ISBN 83-00-00256-1.
- C. Obracht-Prondzyński, T. Wicherkiewicz, (eds) 2011. The Kashubs: Past and Present. ISBN 978-3-03911-975-2, ISBN 978-3-0353-0184-7 (eBook).
