= The Life and Adventures of Remus =

1938 novel by Aleksander Majkowski

Life and Adventures of Remus - the Kashubian Mirror (Kashubian title Żëce i prigodë Remusa - Zvjercadło kaszubskji) is a novel written in the Kashubian language by Dr. Aleksander Majkowski (1876–1938). The linguist Gerald Green regards Life and Adventures of Remus as the Kashubian language's only novel; while theirs is more a scholarly judgement than an objective truth, the preeminence of Life And Adventures to Kashubian literature is undeniable. Although Dr. Majkowski was a prolific author and wrote on a wide range of Kashubian topics, Life and Adventures is considered his master work. Dr. Majkowski worked on Life and Adventures from his college days on, and the novel was only published in its three-book entirety shortly after his death in 1938.

== Plot summary ==
Book 1 "At the Pustkowie" (chapters 1-15) Chapter 1 consists of an introduction delivered by an unknown narrator, who stumbles upon Remus's memoirs. From the second chapter on, Remus himself is the narrator. As a young orphan growing up in the pustkowie (a forest clearing), Remus is cheerful and fulfilled despite all the hard work and a speech impediment which makes him practically incomprehensible. He is troubled, as he grows up, by visions of a young queen and a ruined castle. On the threshold of maturity, he assumes that he will marry his loving and beloved Marta and spend a happy life working in the pustkowie. However, he is summoned to the deathbed of the pustkowie's master, old Pan Jozef Zoblocczi. Pan Jozef informs Remus that his own time as defender of Kashubian culture is over, and that he, Remus, must take up the task. Remus pleads his inability and unworthiness, but when Pan Jozef invokes the young queen and the ruined castle, Remus must accept. In Chapter 15, turning his back on the pustkowie and his beloved Marta, Remus begins his long life of service to Kashubia.

Book 2 "In Freedom and In Captivity" (chapters 16-30) Remus acquires a single-wheeled wheelbarrow, which he fills with Kashubian books and Catholic devotional items. These he sells for a nominal price as he wanders to and from various village and county fairs. Now grown tall and gawky, he cuts a strange and sometimes frightening figure; with his comical sidekick Trąba he gets into various adventures. The most important of these adventures concerns The King of the Lake, another Kashubian patriot who comes to a bad end. At the end of this book, Remus is put into jail by the Germans.

Book 3 "Smętek" (chapters 31-45) Freed from prison and reunited with Trąba, Remus has further adventures. In Chapters 32-33, they meet the patriotic Kashubian priest Father Krause and laugh when the Germans arrest Lutheran pastor Krauze by mistake. In Chapter 36, subtitled "Remus and Trąba in Hell," they visit a Kashubian nobleman's castle, where a learned but roguish house guest named "Derda" scares poor Trąba into thinking the nobleman is actually the Devil. The struggle with the real Devil's emissary, a lawyer named Smętek, takes up the rest of the book. Even when Remus is granted a short time of happiness, it is followed by grief and shame. He dies alone, believing that Smętek has triumphed. But the narrator from Chapter 1 returns, to report that Remus's grave bears a cross inscribed "Remus - Kashubian Knight" and that a mysterious lady and her son come to visit and tend to the grave. Thus the novel ends on a note of hope, however muted.

== Literary technique ==
The novel's subtitle, Zvjercadło kaszubskji ("Kashubian Mirror"), is a clear signal of its lush allegorical content. Remus himself, with his incomprehensible speech and comically peculiar mannerisms, aptly symbolizes outsiders' perception of the Kashubian people. Remus also symbolizes the courage, perseverance, and deep faith Majkowski attributes to his countrymen and countrywomen. The young queen and the buried castle likewise stand, respectively, for the Kashubians' deep faith and their glorious past. The devil's emissary Smętek stands specifically for the evil intentions of individuals who persecute Kashubians, and perhaps for Germans in general. The persecuted priest Father Krause's story is paralleled by those of real life Kashubian priests such as Jan Romuald Byzewski, and the flamboyant "Derda" of Chapter 36 can only be a young Hieronim Derdowski.

Majkowski was well aware that he was obliged, in creating a Kashubian novel worthy of standing with the masterpieces of Western literature, to draw on the full range of literary motifs, references, and other techniques employed by the authors whose work he worked to equal. For example, the colloquy between Remus and Pan Jozef in Chapter 15 contains strong reminiscences of the discussion between Aeneas and his father Anchises in Aeneid VI. Majkowski was likewise aware that his use of the Kashubian language had to represent the diversity of Kashubian culture, the better to speak to all Kashubian people everywhere. Indeed, Majkowski even paid close attention to the Kashubian orthography he used in this work.

== Influence ==
The decades immediately following the publication of Żëce i przigodë Remusa were difficult ones for Kashubians and Poles alike. However, it was translated into Polish (1964), into French (1984), into German (1988), and into English (2008). The novel, and the character of Remus in particular, also feature prominently in modern Kashubian culture. In 2000 a "Remusonalia" culminated in an open-air dramatic performance of the novel. In August 2012, the Wicza Theatre Association of Jasień conducted a two-week Kashubian cultural institute for the young of the region, culminating in two performances of "Nowy Remus" ("New Remus").
