= Old Winona Middle School =

- Interactive map of the Old Winona Middle School area
- Alternative names: Washington Crossing
- Winona High School and Winona Junior High School
- U.S. National Register of Historic Places
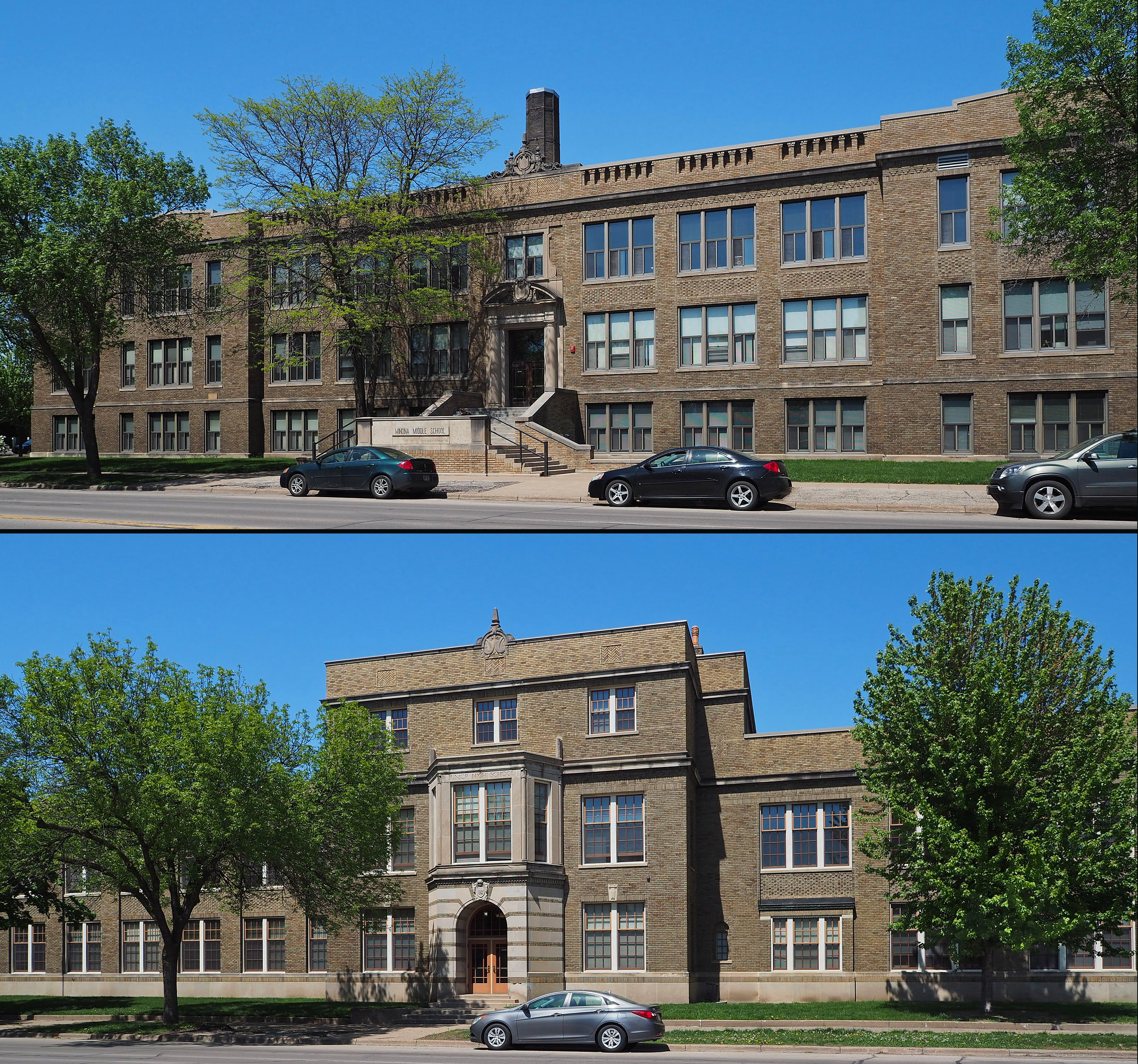
- The East Building/former high school (top) and West Building/former junior high (bottom)

- Location within Minnesota Location within the United States
- Location: 166 and 218 West Broadway Street, Winona, Minnesota
- Coordinates: 44°3′3″N 91°38′31″W
- Area: 2.95 acres (1.19 ha)
- Built: 1915–1917, 1925–1926, 1928
- Architect: Clarence H. Johnston Sr., Croft & Boerner, William B. Ittner
- Architectural style: Neoclassical
- NRHP reference No.: 03001350
- Designated: January 2, 2004

The Old Winona Middle School is a former school complex in Winona, Minnesota, United States. The east building was originally constructed as the Winona High School from 1915 to 1917 and the west building was added as the Winona Junior High School in 1926. An auditorium was added to the rear of the east building in 1928. In 1988 the complex became the Winona Middle School. The property was listed on the National Register of Historic Places as the Winona High School and Winona Junior High School in 2004 for its local significance in the theme of education. It was nominated for representing local efforts to implement progressive educational trends in updated facilities, while offering cultural experiences to the wider community through professional music performances in the auditorium.

An adaptive reuse project completed in 2004 converted the former school into the Washington Crossing apartments.

== Construction ==
Winona's original high school was built on the site of the west building in 1887. By the early 20th century the student body had swollen to twice the intended capacity of the building, pushing instructional spaces into the attic, basement, and stairwells. The Winona Board of Education began planning a new high school in 1913, purchasing the neighboring lot across Washington Street and ultimately hiring architect Clarence H. Johnston Sr. of Saint Paul, who had recently designed what is now Phelps Hall at Winona State University. The board also took the opportunity to incorporate the latest trends in education, such as classrooms for both academic and vocational training, and large windows for maximum sunlight (which was considered to promote student health and cleanse classrooms). Construction began in September 1915 and the district's 10th, 11th, and 12th grades moved into the new building in February 1917.

The 1887 building was adapted for another new educational trend, the junior high school, created to provide more of a transition for students between elementary and high school. Initially only eighth and ninth grade met there, leaving seventh grade at the elementary school. In 1922 the board of education prioritized construction of a new junior high school building on the site of the old. The firm of Croft & Boerner was hired, with William B. Ittner of St. Louis as a consulting architect. The new facility was designed to complement the high school across the street. Construction began in February 1925, with half the building complete and available for classes in September of that year and the other half ready in January 1926.

The district's next priority project was a gymnasium, another reflection of new educational principles. William B. Ittner was hired back to design a combined gymnasium and auditorium, with a swimming pool in the basement. Again it was closely matched to the style and color of the existing facilities. Construction began in summer 1927 and was complete in December of the following year.

== Changing use ==
In 1967 the Winona Senior High School was constructed at 901 Gilmore Avenue, and both buildings on Broadway became the Winona Junior High School. In 1988 the junior high school was renamed the Winona Middle School as ninth grade was shifted to the new high school and sixth grade moved in from the elementary school. However the facility was noticeably aging, lacked space for athletic fields, and was awkwardly split into two buildings. Whether to renovate or relocate proved to be a contentious local issue for years. Two referendums to renovate the existing facilities were defeated, but a referendum to construct a new middle school passed in 1997.

Proposals for what to do with the existing school buildings included reuse for subsidized housing, a university dormitory, a teen community center, or expansion space for the adjacent Winona Public Library. A special task force ultimately voted in 1998 to sell the buildings to MetroPlains, a Saint Paul-based redeveloper, for conversion into affordable housing.

Meanwhile, the new Winona Middle School was constructed at 1570 Homer Road. The final day of classes in the old school was June 7, 2000. That fall, as students began attending the new middle school, renovation work was delayed when the Winona County Courthouse flooded and the west school building was pressed into service to house county offices. Renovations to convert the old middle school into the Washington Crossing apartment complex ultimately took place from July 2003 to October 2004, and new tenants began moving in that December.

== Auditorium ==
The Washington Crossing renovation did not include the 1928 auditorium/gymnasium attached to the east building, and it has sat vacant since 2000. Pipes that burst over the winter of 2015–2016 have left standing water in the auditorium's balcony and in front of the stage, though the facility remains structurally sound. Options for reuse are complicated by the fact that the city has already restored the Winona Masonic Temple into a community theater space just a block away.

== See also ==
- National Register of Historic Places listings in Winona County, Minnesota
