= Choate Department Store =

- U.S. National Register of Historic Places
- U.S. Historic district – Contributing property
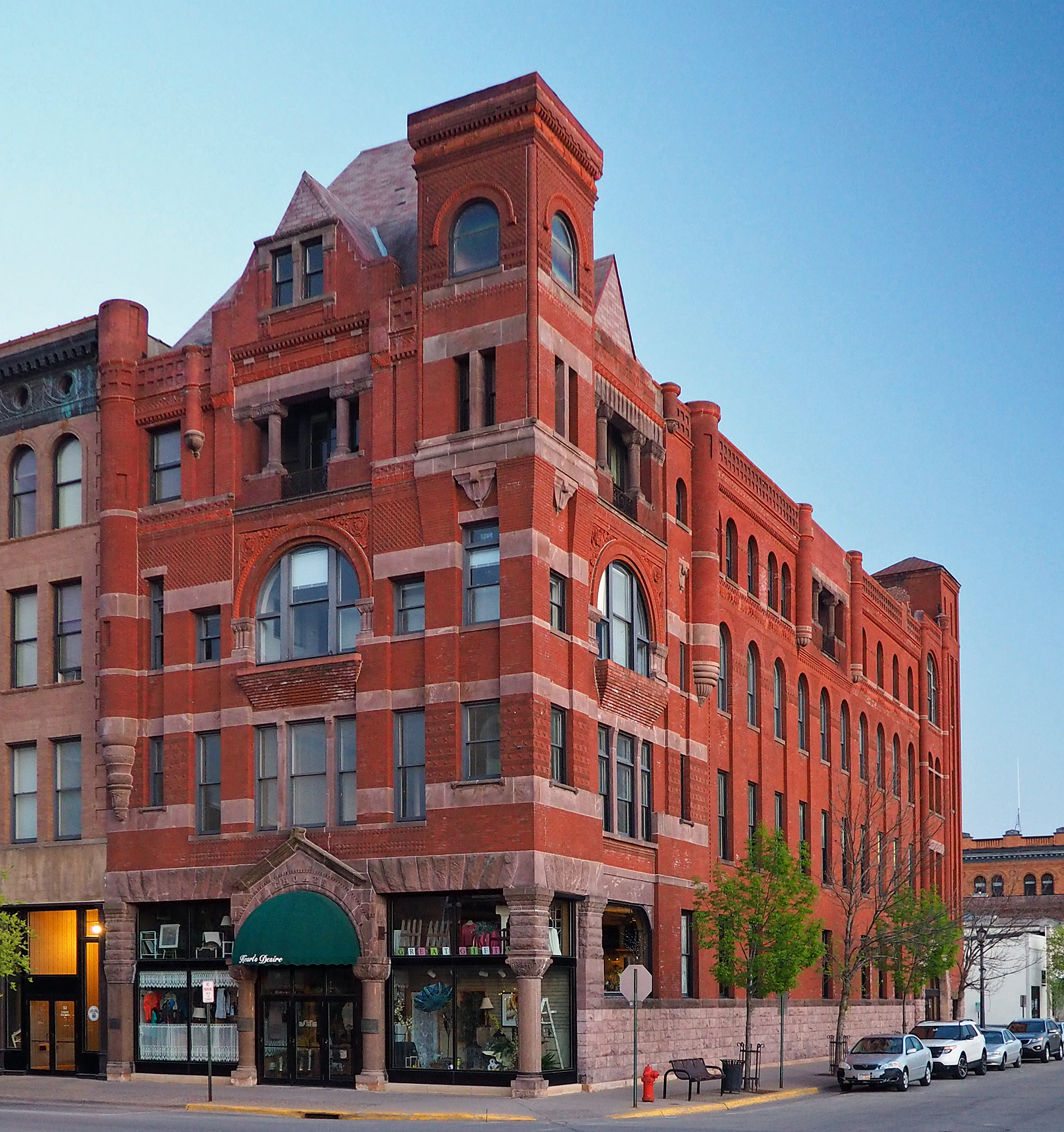
- The Choate Department Store viewed from the north

- Location within Minnesota Location within the United States
- Location: 51 East 3rd Street, Winona, Minnesota
- Coordinates: 44°3′7″N 91°38′11″W
- Area: Less than one acre
- Built: 1881
- Architect: A.E. Myhre
- Architectural style: Romanesque Revival
- Part of: Winona Commercial Historic District (ID98001220)
- NRHP reference No.: 76001079

Significant dates
- Added to NRHP: June 3, 1976
- Designated CP: October 1, 1998

The Choate Department Store is a historic commercial building in Winona, Minnesota, United States. It was built in 1881 for Hannibal Choate (1835–1923), an early Winona-based merchant who achieved such regional prominence that he became known as the "merchant prince of southeastern Minnesota". The building was listed on the National Register of Historic Places in 1976 for its local significance in the theme of commerce. It was nominated for its associations with Choate, who pioneered fixed price retail and in-store merchandise displays in the region, and boosted his bottom line by wholesaling to other merchants.

In 1998 the store was also included as a contributing property of the Winona Commercial Historic District.

== See also ==
- National Register of Historic Places listings in Winona County, Minnesota
