= Winona Hotel =

- U.S. National Register of Historic Places
- U.S. Historic district – Contributing property
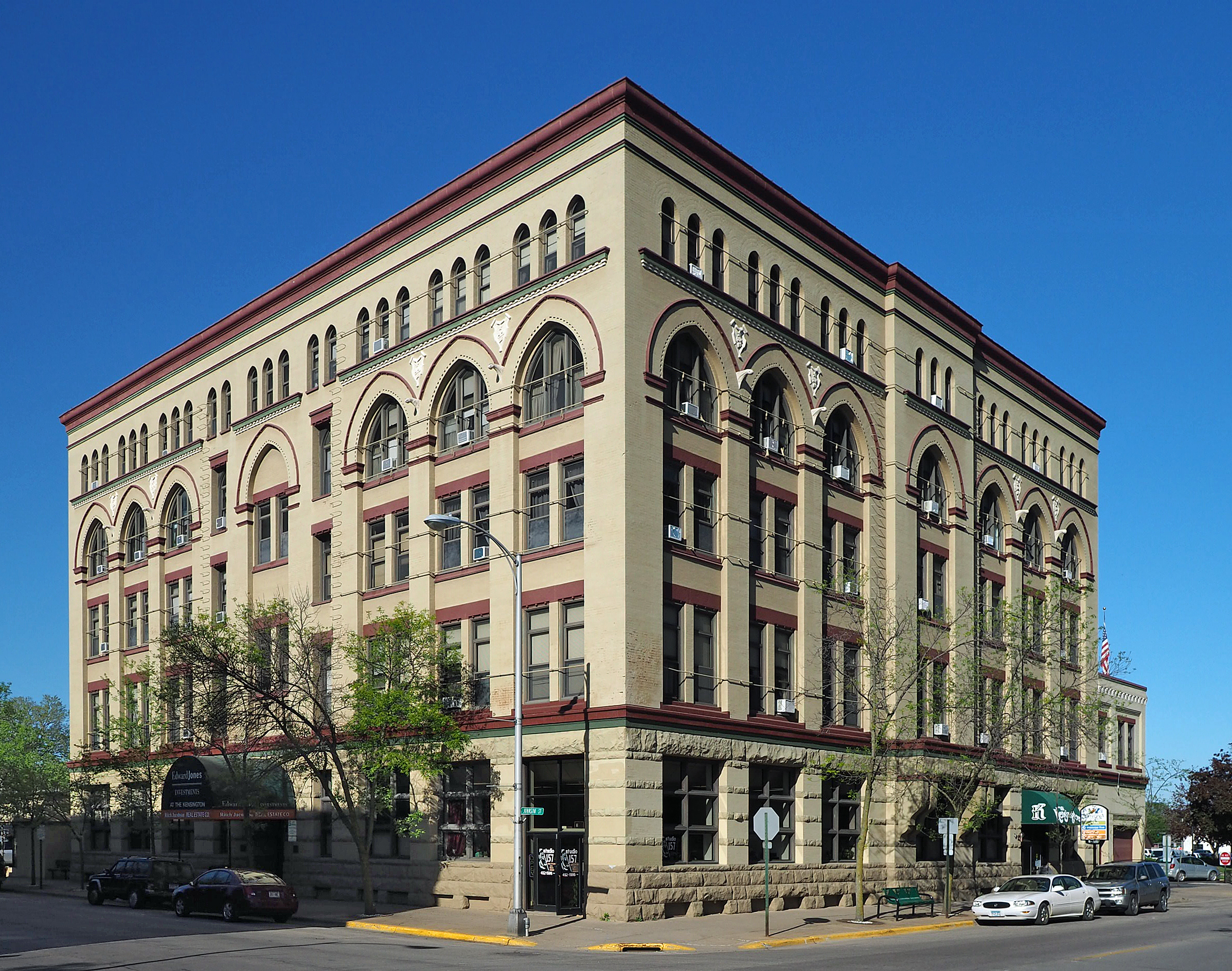
- The Winona Hotel from the northeast

- Location within Minnesota Location within the United States
- Location: 157 W. 3rd Street, Winona, Minnesota
- Coordinates: 44°3′11″N 91°38′23″W
- Area: Less than one acre
- Built: 1889
- Architect: George B. Ferry
- Architectural style: Romanesque Revival
- Part of: Winona Commercial Historic District (ID98001220)
- NRHP reference No.: 83000947

Significant dates
- Added to NRHP: March 31, 1983
- Designated CP: October 1, 1998

The Winona Hotel is a former hotel building in Winona, Minnesota, United States, constructed in 1889. It was listed on the National Register of Historic Places in 1983 for its local significance in the themes of architecture and commerce. It was nominated for its locally distinctive Romanesque Revival architecture and origin as a hotel specifically constructed to accommodate out-of-town visitors during Winona's heyday as a fine theatre destination. The Winona Hotel is also a contributing property to the Winona Commercial Historic District. Now known as The Kensington, the building has been converted to senior apartments.

== See also ==
- National Register of Historic Places listings in Winona County, Minnesota
