= Anger's Block =

- U.S. National Register of Historic Places
- U.S. Historic district – Contributing property
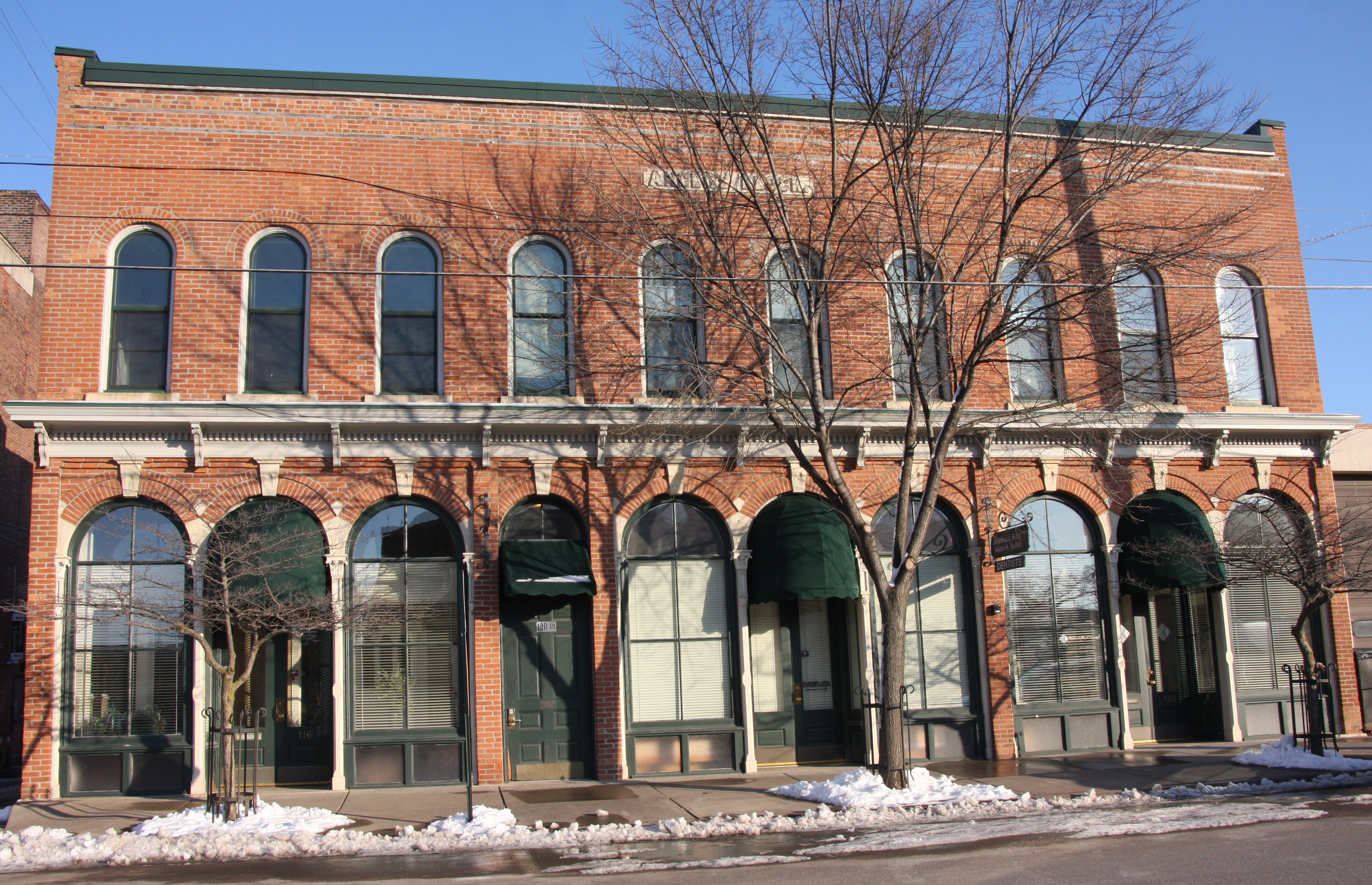
- Anger's Block viewed from the northwest

- Location within Minnesota Location within the United States
- Location: 116–120 Walnut Street, Winona, Minnesota
- Coordinates: 44°3′7″N 91°38′0.5″W
- Area: .165 acres (0.067 ha)
- Built: 1872
- Architect: Charles Maybury & Co.
- Architectural style: Italianate
- Part of: Winona Commercial Historic District (ID98001220)
- NRHP reference No.: 78001571

Significant dates
- Added to NRHP: January 31, 1978
- Designated CP: October 1, 1998

Anger's Block is a historic commercial building in Winona, Minnesota, United States. Built in 1872, it is one of the oldest surviving commercial buildings in Winona's central business district. The building was listed on the National Register of Historic Places in 1978 for its local significance in the theme of architecture. It was nominated for its early status among Winona's downtown buildings, which is furthered by the survival of its original architectural plans. In 1998 the building was also listed as a contributing property to the Winona Commercial Historic District.

== See also ==
- National Register of Historic Places listings in Winona County, Minnesota
