= Madison Elementary School =

There are a number of elementary schools named Madison Elementary School. Here is a list of schools that use the name.

== In real life ==
- Madison Elementary School (Davenport, Iowa), NRHP-nominated and possibly NRHP-listed
- Madison Elementary School (Fargo, North Dakota)
- Madison Elementary School (Madison, Alabama)
- Madison Elementary School (Norman, Oklahoma)
- Madison Elementary School (Ogden, Utah)
- Madison Elementary School (Pittsburgh, Pennsylvania), a Pittsburgh Landmark
- Madison Elementary School (Santa Ana, California)
- Madison Elementary School (Skokie, Illinois)
- Madison Elementary School (West Allis, Wisconsin)
- Madison Elementary School (Marshfield, Wisconsin)
- Madison Elementary School (Winona, Minnesota)
- Madison Elementary School (Blaine, Minnesota)

== Fiction ==
- An elementary school that appears on Cartoon Network's Ben 10 original series.
