= Schlitz =

Schlitz may refer to:

- Joseph Schlitz Brewing Company
- Milwaukee Schlitz, former professional softball team
- Schlitz, Hesse, a town in Germany
- Schlitz (river), a river in Germany
- Schlitz Hotel, in Winona, Minnesota, United States

== People with the surname ==
- Don Schlitz (1952–2026), American award-winning country music songwriter
- Emil von Schlitz (1851–1914), German sculptor
- George Schlitz (1909–1989), Australian rules footballer
- Joseph Schlitz (1831–1875), German entrepreneur
- Karl von Schlitz (1822–1885), German politician
- Laura Amy Schlitz (born 1955), American author of children's literature
- Sarah Schlitz (born 1986), Belgian politician
