= Warren Powers Laird =

American architect

- Born: 8 August 1861; Winona, Minnesota, U.S.
- Died: 18 February 1948 (aged 86); Bryn Mawr, Pennsylvania, U.S.
- Education: Cornell University
- Occupations: Architect, professor
- Known for: Dean of the School of Fine Arts, University of Pennsylvania
- Awards: FAIA
- Buildings: Winona Free Public Library; Stock Pavilion; Winona Masonic Temple

Warren Powers Laird FAIA (August 8, 1861 – February 18, 1948) was an American architect from Minnesota. He was Dean of the School of Fine Arts of the University of Pennsylvania from 1920 to his retirement in 1932.

== Biography ==
Laird was born in Winona, Minnesota, on August 8, 1861. He attended public schools in Winona, followed by study at the Winona Normal School. From 1885 to 1887, Laird took an architecture course at Cornell University. He then practiced for six years in architectural offices in Minnesota, Boston, and New York City, then studied in Paris. Near the end of his Cornell coursework, he was named an instructor of architecture. In January 1891, he was named a Professor of Architecture at the University of Pennsylvania.

In 1911, Laird was awarded an honorary Doctor of Science by Pennsylvania. He was elevated to Dean of the School of Fine Arts there in 1920. He retired in 1932 and was named professor emeritus. Laird frequently consulted for state and municipal governments. He was on the national advisory council of Lingnan University in Canton, China, and was a trustee there for seventeen years. He served on the architectural jury of the art competitions at the 1932 Summer Olympics.

Laird married Clara Elizabeth Tuller on November 15, 1893. They had two children: Mary Hall and Helen Powers, the latter not surviving to adulthood. Laird served a term as president of the Fine Arts League of Philadelphia and served the American Institute of Architects on its Committee of Education. He died at his home in Bryn Mawr, Pennsylvania, on February 18, 1948.

== Works ==
- Winona Free Public Library (1899), Winona, Minnesota
- Stock Pavilion (1908) (with Paul Philippe Cret), Madison, Wisconsin
- Winona Masonic Temple (1909), Winona
- Lathrop Hall (1910) (with Cret), Madison
- Agricultural Chemistry Building (1912) (with Cret), Madison
