= Huff–Lamberton House =

Historic house in Minnesota, United States

- Huff-Lamberton House
- U.S. National Register of Historic Places
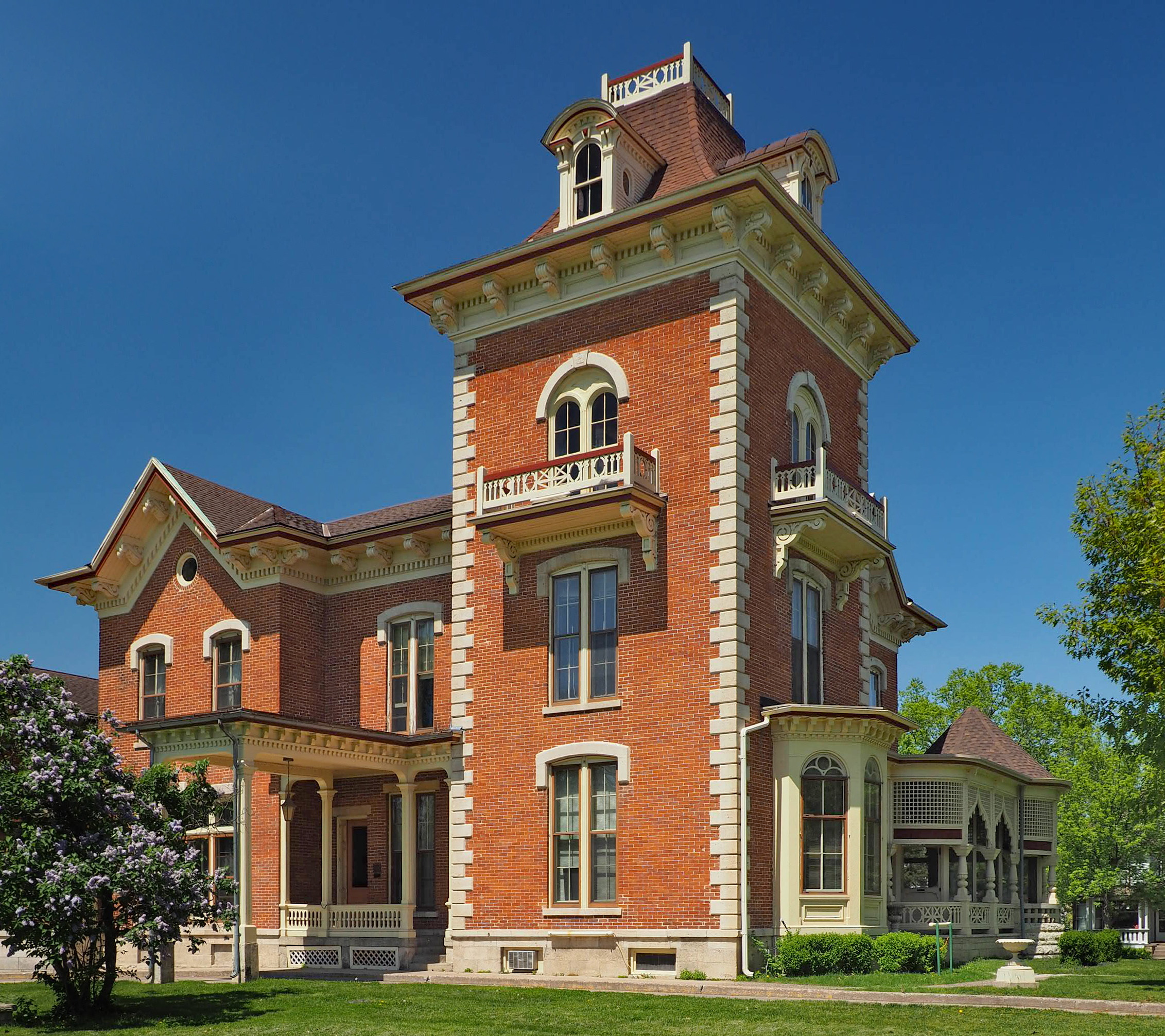
- The Huff–Lamberton House viewed from the southeast

- Location within Minnesota Location within the United States
- Location: 207 Huff Street, Winona, Minnesota
- Coordinates: 44°3′11″N 91°38′39.5″W
- Area: 1 acre (0.40 ha)
- Built: 1857, 1873
- Architectural style: Italianate
- NRHP reference No.: 76001080
- Designated: December 12, 1976

The Huff–Lamberton House is a historic house in Winona, Minnesota, United States. It was built in 1857, and in 1873 it was given a Moorish Revival porch. It was listed on the National Register of Historic Places in 1976 for its state-level significance in the theme of architecture. It was nominated for being one of Minnesota's oldest and best preserved Italian Villa style houses. It is currently owned by Kappa Chi Fraternity.

== History ==
Early Winona settlers Henry and Harriet Huff had this opulent brick house built for themselves in 1857, when the city's environment consisted mostly of rough lumber buildings and dirt roads. Within a few years, the Huffs, having made a sufficient fortune, moved to Chicago and sold the house to Henry Lamberton. He added the Moorish Revival porch in 1873 during the height of the late-19th-century Orientalism fad.

The house stayed in the Lamberton family until 1956, when the last heir died. During the 1960s it was converted to an orphanage. Sauer Memorial Homes purchased the house in 1982 and operated it as an assisted living facility for the next 24 years. In 2006 they determined that they couldn't afford upgrades to make the house more handicap-accessible, and put it up for sale. It languished on the market for five years, finally selling in 2011 for barely more than half of its assessed $1.1 million value. Bluff City Properties, the new owners, planned to use the main house for senior housing while operating the carriage house and another outbuilding as event venues. It was purchased in 2023 by Kappa Chi, a local Fraternity for $1.85 million.

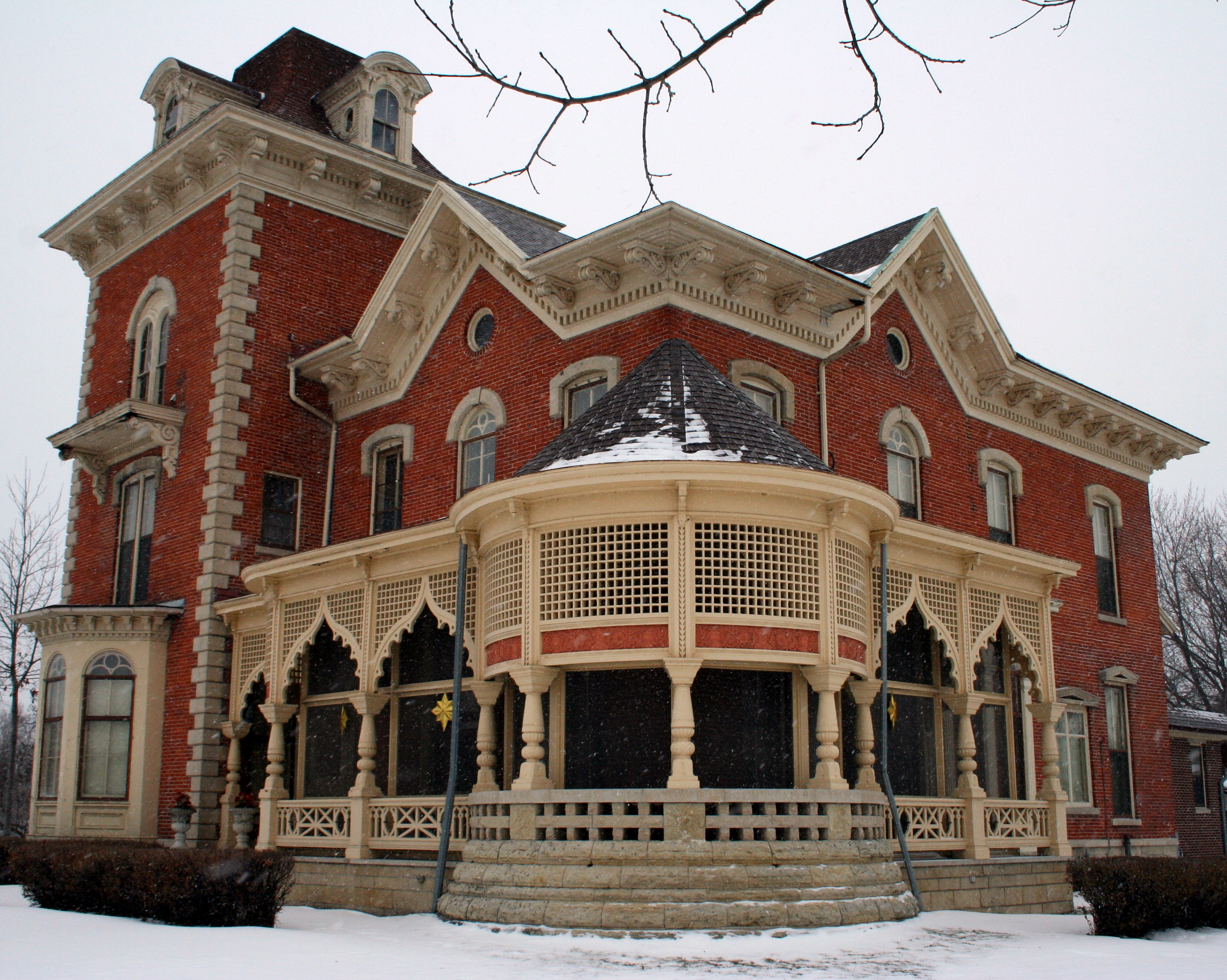
View of the 1873 Moorish Revival porch

== See also ==
- National Register of Historic Places listings in Winona County, Minnesota
