= Latsch Building =

- Kirch/Latsch Building
- U.S. National Register of Historic Places
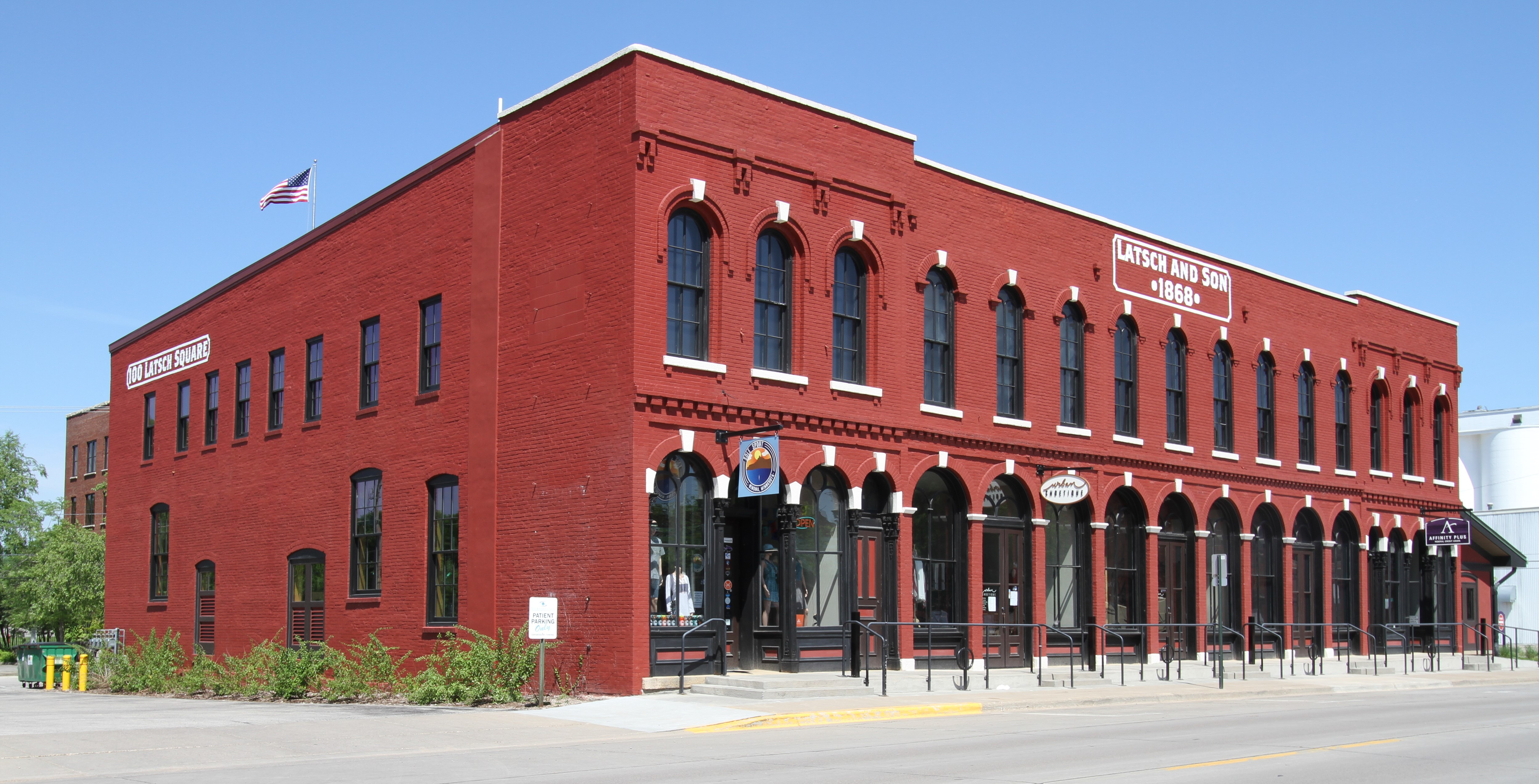
- The Latsch & Son Building from the west in 2018

- Location within Minnesota Location within the United States
- Location: 114–122 East Second Street, Winona, Minnesota
- Coordinates: 44°3′10.5″N 91°38′1.5″W
- Area: Less than one acre
- Built: 1860–1880s
- Architectural style: Gothic Revival/Italianate
- NRHP reference No.: 75001036
- Designated NRHP: May 21, 1975

The Latsch Building is a historic commercial property in Winona, Minnesota, United States. Once known as the Kupietz Block, it was constructed in stages from 1860 to the 1880s. It was listed on the National Register of Historic Places in 1975 (under the misspelled name Kirch/Latch Building) for having local significance in the themes of architecture and commerce. It was nominated for its transitional Gothic Revival/Italianate architecture and its former occupation by the largest of several produce wholesalers that based themselves in Winona to take advantage of the city's river and rail connections.

== History ==
The Latsch Building's history is not entirely known. Its official National Register documentation gives a construction date of circa 1868, but more recent sources give a start date of 1860 and note that it was altered and expanded over the next few decades. During an extensive renovation in 2015, the owner posited that the visible structure had been constructed around an older building in 1890. Whatever the timeframe, the brick building's façade was designed in the Italianate style that was then coming into vogue, but retained overtones of the older Gothic Revival design, particularly in regard to the windows. Cast-iron Corinthian columns were added to the front façade in the 1880s.

Historical documents confirm that the building was occupied by J.B. Kirch & Company, a farm implement dealer, from the early 1870s to the late 1880s. By the mid 1890s it was being converted to a store and warehouse for major local grocery retailer and wholesaler Latsch & Son. The elder Latsch was a Swiss immigrant who farmed near Dodge, Wisconsin, until he was crippled in an accident. He and his family moved to Winona, where he began a grocery business. Several grocery wholesalers based themselves in Winona in the late 19th century due to its status as a river and rail transportation hub, and Latsch & Son became the biggest of them. Between 1866 and the 1930s the company was the leading business and primary tenant of Winona's East Second Street commercial district. The son, John A. Latsch, had been born in 1861 and took over the thriving company in 1909 upon his father's death. The younger Latsch was a prominent figure in Winona, a hardworking but eccentric loner who donated hundreds of thousands of dollars to local charities and 20,000 acres (8,100 ha) of land for public parks.

In 1933 the Latsch Building was occupied by the Grams Feed and Seed Store. Other small businesses were located in the building at various times as well, including a saloon, a clothing store, a cigar manufacturer, a doctor's office, and a real estate office. It was home to a food co-op from 1972 to 2000.

== Restoration ==
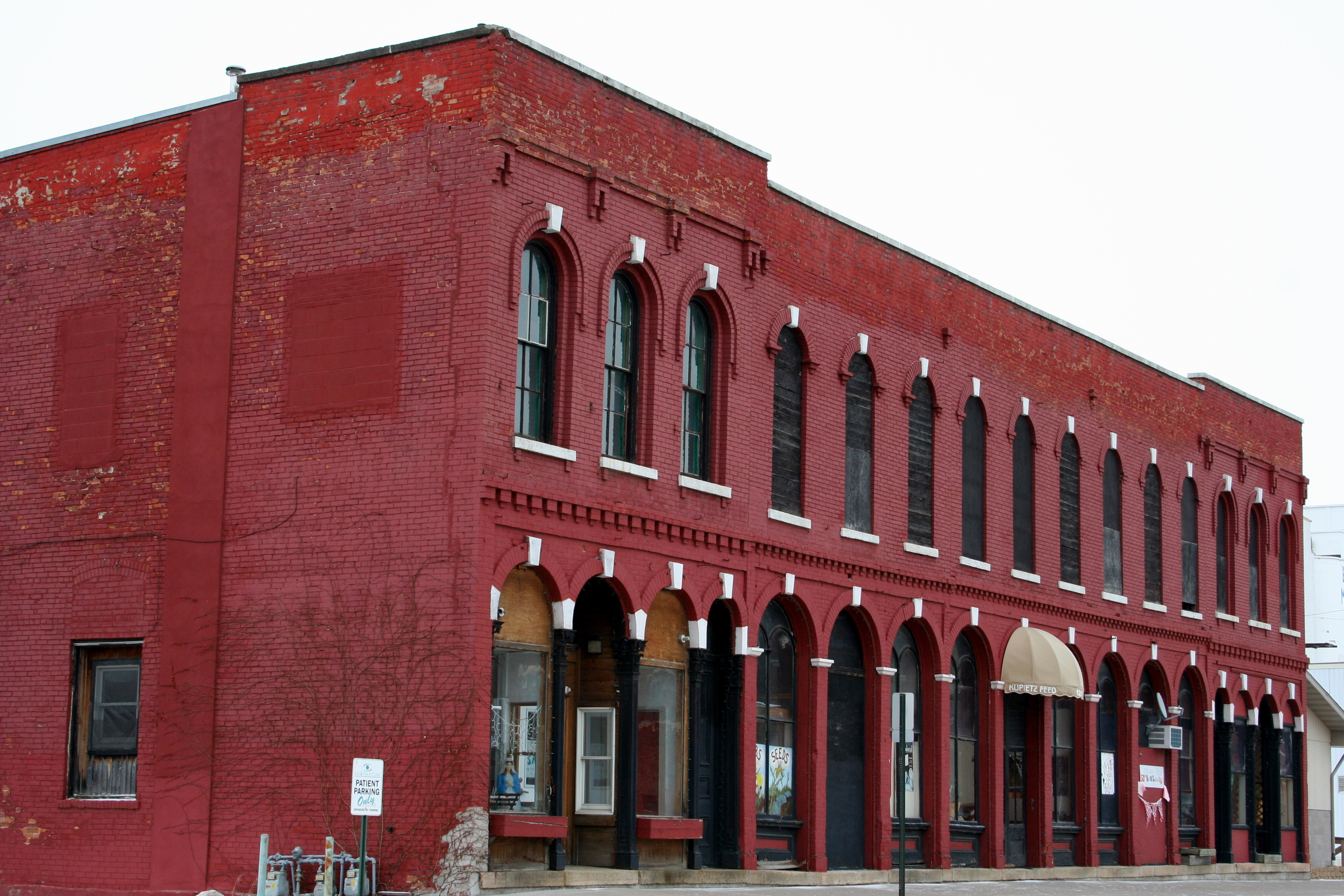
The building in 2009, before restoration

In 2014 new developers purchased the building and embarked on a nearly $3 million restoration. According to news reports, project partners Peter Shortridge and Mike Gostomski were motivated to restore the building "as close to its original condition as possible". They renamed the property the Latsch & Son Building since it was the only remaining structure in Winona that once housed the Latsches' grocery empire. A quarter of the floorspace is leased to a credit union, with space for other commercial tenants on the ground floor and for offices on the second floor. The developers and civic officials billed the project as a major first step in revitalizing the former industrial zone that isolates Winona from its downtown riverfront.

== See also ==
- National Register of Historic Places listings in Winona County, Minnesota
