= Schlitz Hotel =

- U.S. National Register of Historic Places
- U.S. Historic district – Contributing property
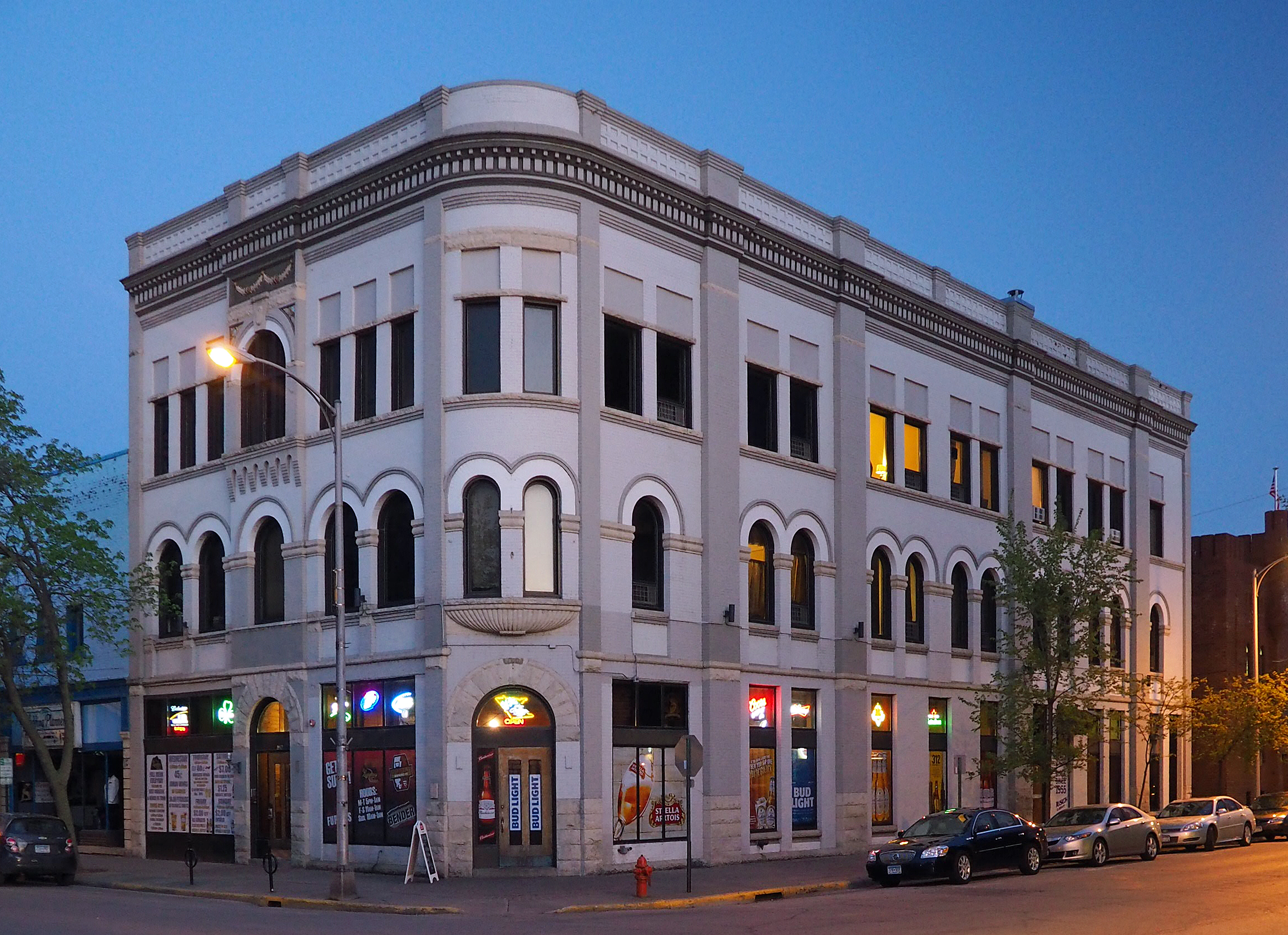
- The Schlitz Hotel viewed from the north

- Location within Minnesota Location within the United States
- Location: 129 West 3rd Street, Winona, Minnesota
- Coordinates: 44°3′10″N 91°38′21″W
- Area: Less than one acre
- Built: 1892
- Architect: Charles Kirchhoff, Jr.
- Part of: Winona Commercial Historic District (ID98001220)
- NRHP reference No.: 82003087

Significant dates
- Added to NRHP: August 26, 1982
- Designated CP: October 1, 1998

The Schlitz Hotel is a former hotel and saloon in Winona, Minnesota, United States. It operated from 1892 to 1921 as one of many such establishments commissioned around the Upper Midwest by the Joseph Schlitz Brewing Company of Milwaukee. The building was listed on the National Register of Historic Places in 1982 for its local significance in the themes of architecture and commerce. It was nominated for being a well-preserved example of this once-common business venture by breweries. In 1998 the Schlitz Hotel was also included as a contributing property of the Winona Commercial Historic District.

== See also ==
- National Register of Historic Places listings in Winona County, Minnesota
