= Central Grade School (Winona, Minnesota) =

- U.S. National Register of Historic Places
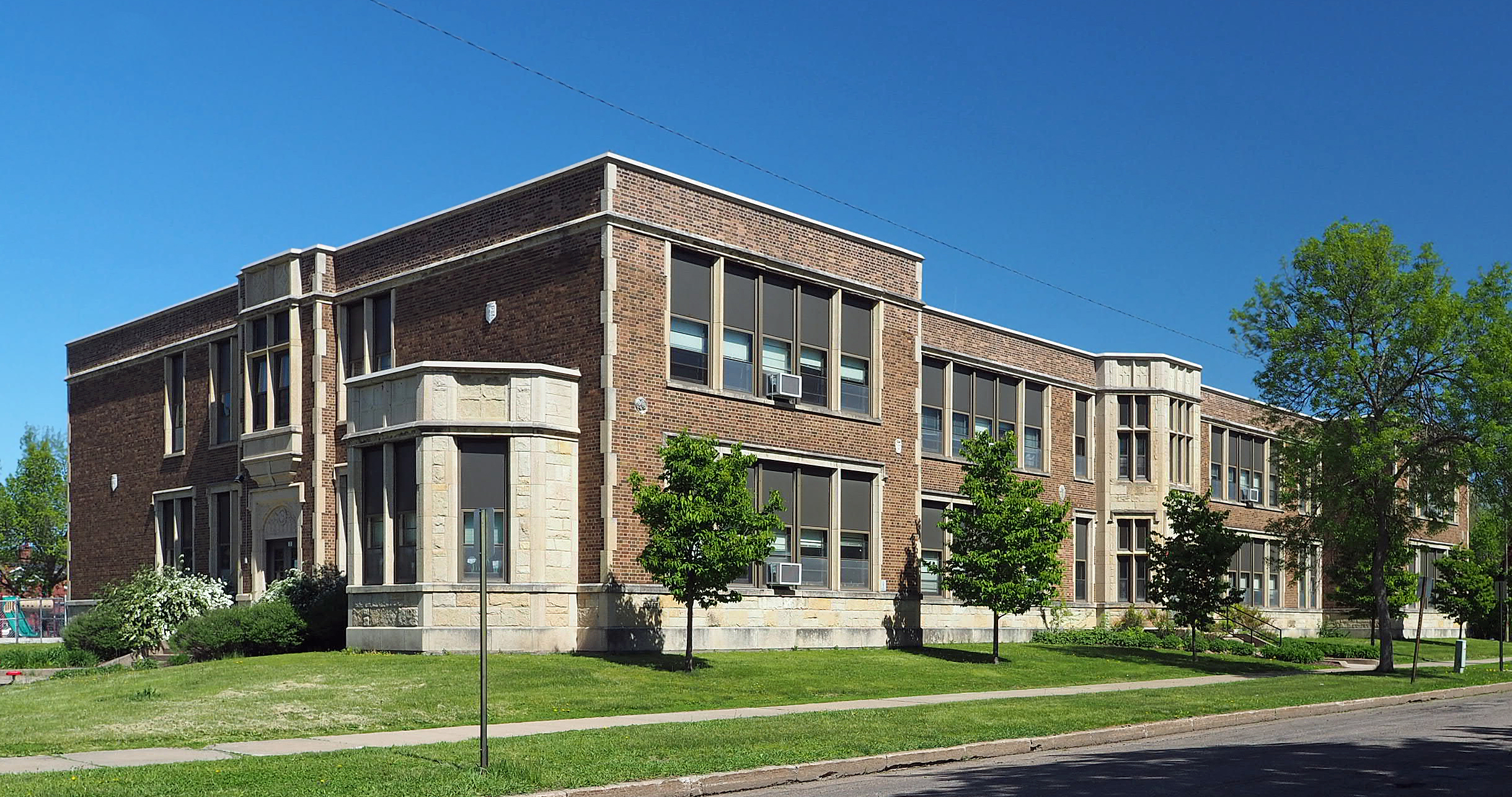
- Central Grade School viewed from the northeast

- Location within Minnesota Location within the United States
- Location: 317 Market Street, Winona, Minnesota
- Coordinates: 44°2′53″N 91°38′5″W
- Area: 2.07 acres (0.84 ha)
- Built: 1930
- Built by: Seidlitz–Schwab & Co.
- Architect: Boyum, Schubert & Sorensen
- Architectural style: Late Gothic Revival
- NRHP reference No.: 12000071
- Designated: March 6, 2012

Central Grade School is an elementary school in Winona, Minnesota, United States. Its building was constructed in 1930, the first of five new facilities built by Winona Public Schools in the early 20th century. It was listed on the National Register of Historic Places in 2012 for its local significance in the theme of education. It was nominated for representing the efforts of Winona Public Schools to implement progressive educational reforms such as separated grades, kindergartens, gymnasiums, art and music classrooms, and improved hygiene and fire safety features.

== See also ==
- National Register of Historic Places listings in Winona County, Minnesota
