= East Second Street Commercial Historic District (Winona, Minnesota) =

Historic district in Minnesota, United States

- U.S. National Register of Historic Places
- U.S. Historic district
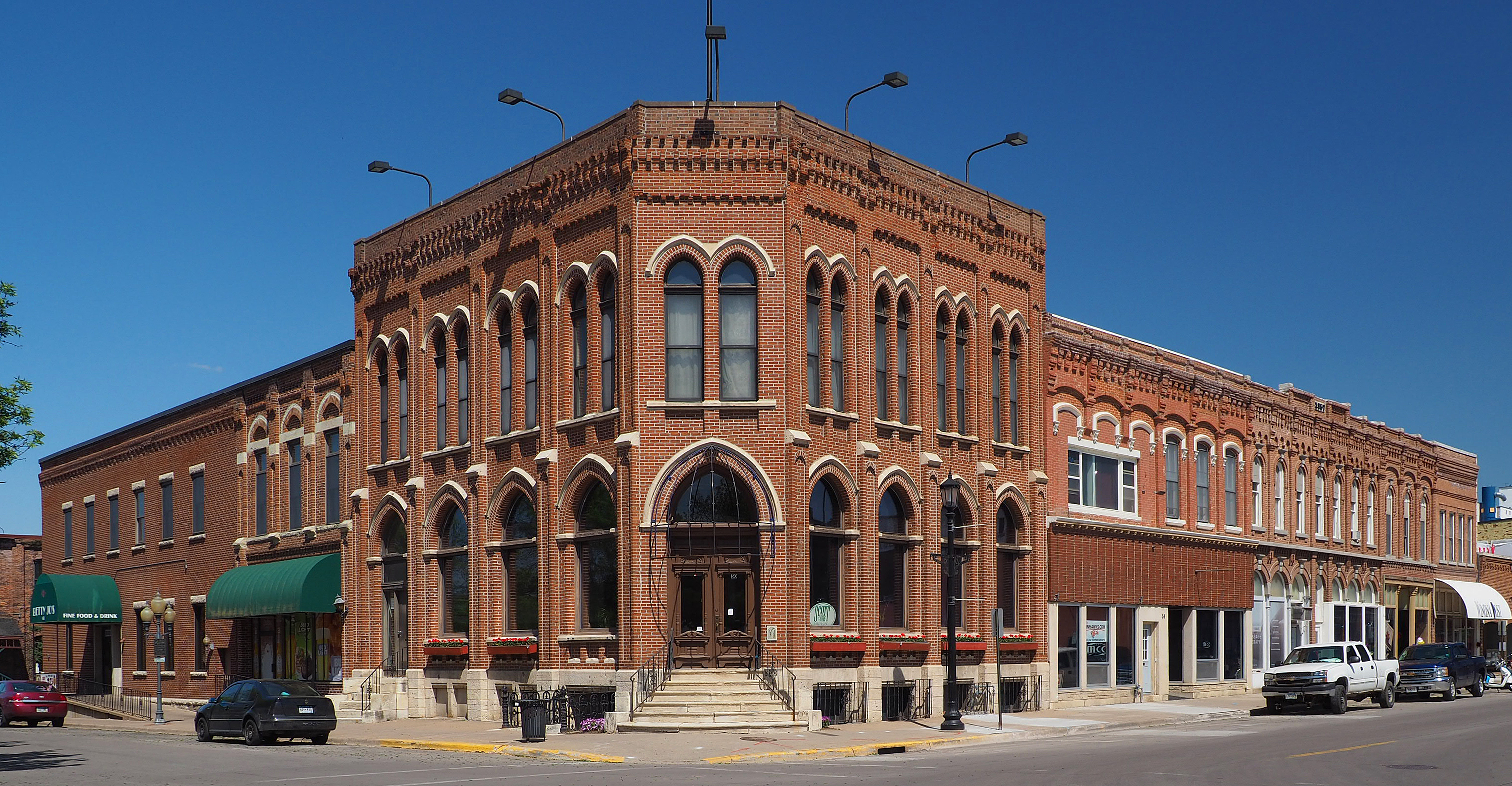
- View of the northeast corner of 2nd and Center Sts

- Location within Minnesota Location within the United States
- Location: 66–78 Center, 54–78 East 2nd, and 67–71 Lafayette Streets, Winona, Minnesota
- Coordinates: 44°3′12″N 91°38′7″W
- Area: 3 acres (1.2 ha)
- Built: 1863–1915
- Architectural style: Gothic Revival, Italianate
- NRHP reference No.: 90002198
- Designated HD: January 25, 1991

The East Second Street Commercial Historic District is a small historic district in Winona, Minnesota, United States. It comprises 14 contributing properties mostly built in the late 1860s. The district was listed on the National Register of Historic Places in 1991 for its state-level significance in the themes of architecture and commerce. It was nominated for being one of the few surviving remnants of the original business district of a Minnesota river town, and for being a symbol of Winona's swift growth as a lumber and grain trade center.

== See also ==
- National Register of Historic Places listings in Winona County, Minnesota
