= Whitewater Township, Winona County, Minnesota =

Whitewater Township, Minnesota
- Township
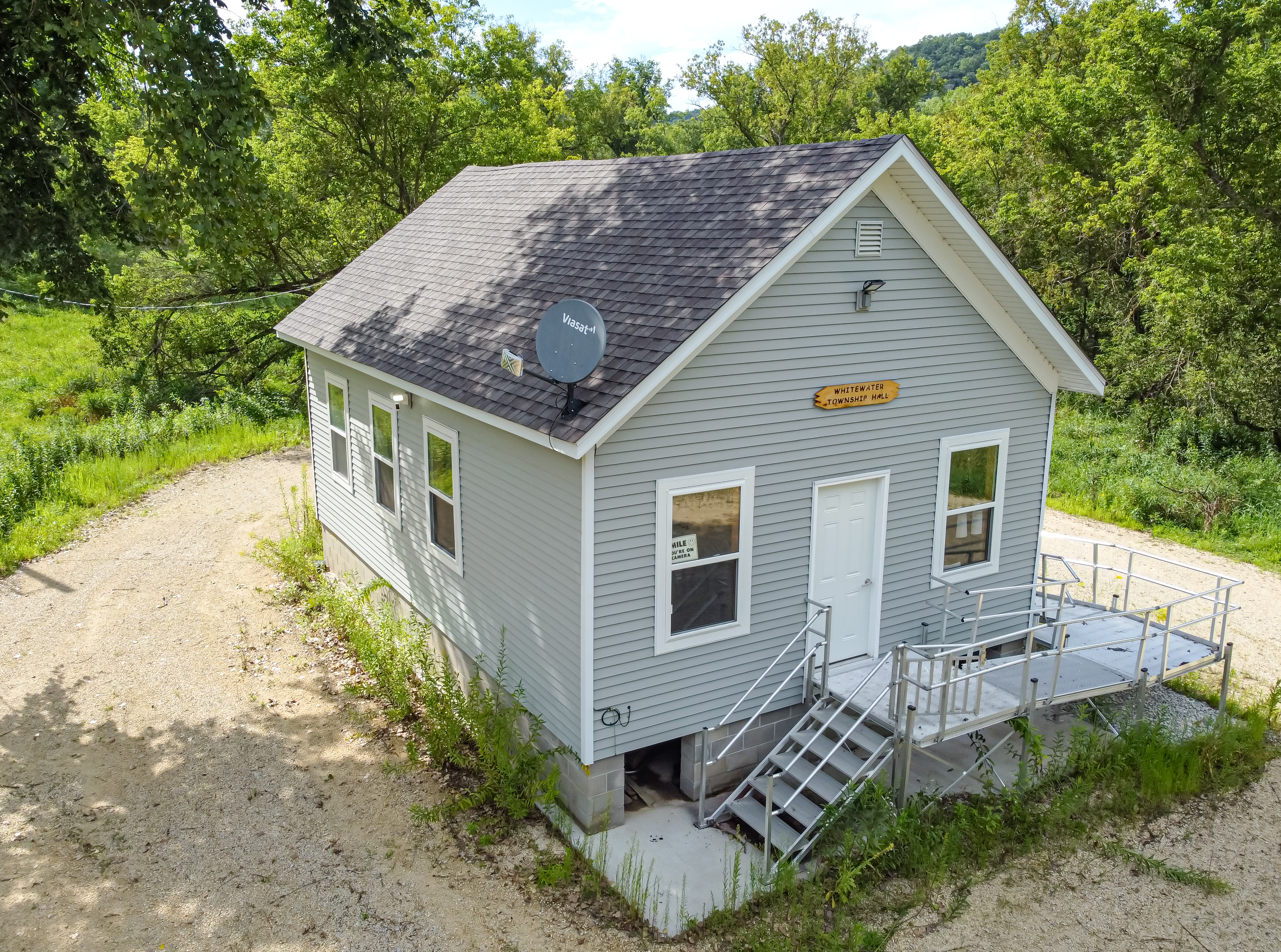
- Town hall

- Location within the state of Minnesota Whitewater Township, Minnesota (the United States)
- Coordinates: 44°9′15″N 92°0′49″W
- Country: United States
- State: Minnesota
- County: Winona

Area
  - Total: 35.3 sq mi (91.5 km^{2})
  - Land: 35.2 sq mi (91.2 km^{2})
  - Water: 0.12 sq mi (0.3 km^{2})
- Elevation: 725 ft (221 m)

Population (2010)
  - Total: 198
  - Density: 5.62/sq mi (2.17/km^{2})
- Time zone: UTC-6 (Central (CST))
  - Summer (DST): UTC-5 (CDT)
- FIPS code: 27-70168
- GNIS feature ID: 0665991

Whitewater Township is a township in Winona County, Minnesota, United States. The population was 198 at the 2010 census.

== History ==
Whitewater Township took its name from the Whitewater River.

== Geography ==
According to the United States Census Bureau, the township has a total area of 35.3 square miles (91 km^{2}); 35.2 square miles (91 km^{2}) is land and 0.1 square miles (0.26 km^{2}), or 0.37%, is water. One property within the township is listed on the National Register of Historic Places: the Nicholas Marnach House, built 1857–1860.

== Demographics ==
As of the census of 2000, there were 202 people, 65 households, and 52 families residing in the township. The population density was 5.7 people per square mile (2.2/km^{2}). There were 70 housing units at an average density of 2.0/sq mi (0.8/km^{2}). The racial makeup of the township was 97.52% White, 0.99% from other races, and 1.49% from two or more races. Hispanic or Latino of any race were 1.98% of the population.

There were 65 households, out of which 44.6% had children under the age of 18 living with them, 70.8% were married couples living together, 3.1% had a female householder with no husband present, and 20.0% were non-families. 16.9% of all households were made up of individuals, and 3.1% had someone living alone who was 65 years of age or older. The average household size was 3.11 and the average family size was 3.56.

In the township the population was spread out, with 34.2% under the age of 18, 6.9% from 18 to 24, 30.2% from 25 to 44, 21.3% from 45 to 64, and 7.4% who were 65 years of age or older. The median age was 32 years. For every 100 females, there were 112.6 males. For every 100 females age 18 and over, there were 121.7 males.

The median income for a household in the township was $51,875, and the median income for a family was $58,125. Males had a median income of $28,750 versus $19,167 for females. The per capita income for the township was $19,122. None of the families and 0.9% of the population were living below the poverty line, including no under eighteens and 10.5% of those over 64.
