= Nicholas Marnach House =

Historic house in Minnesota, United States

- U.S. National Register of Historic Places
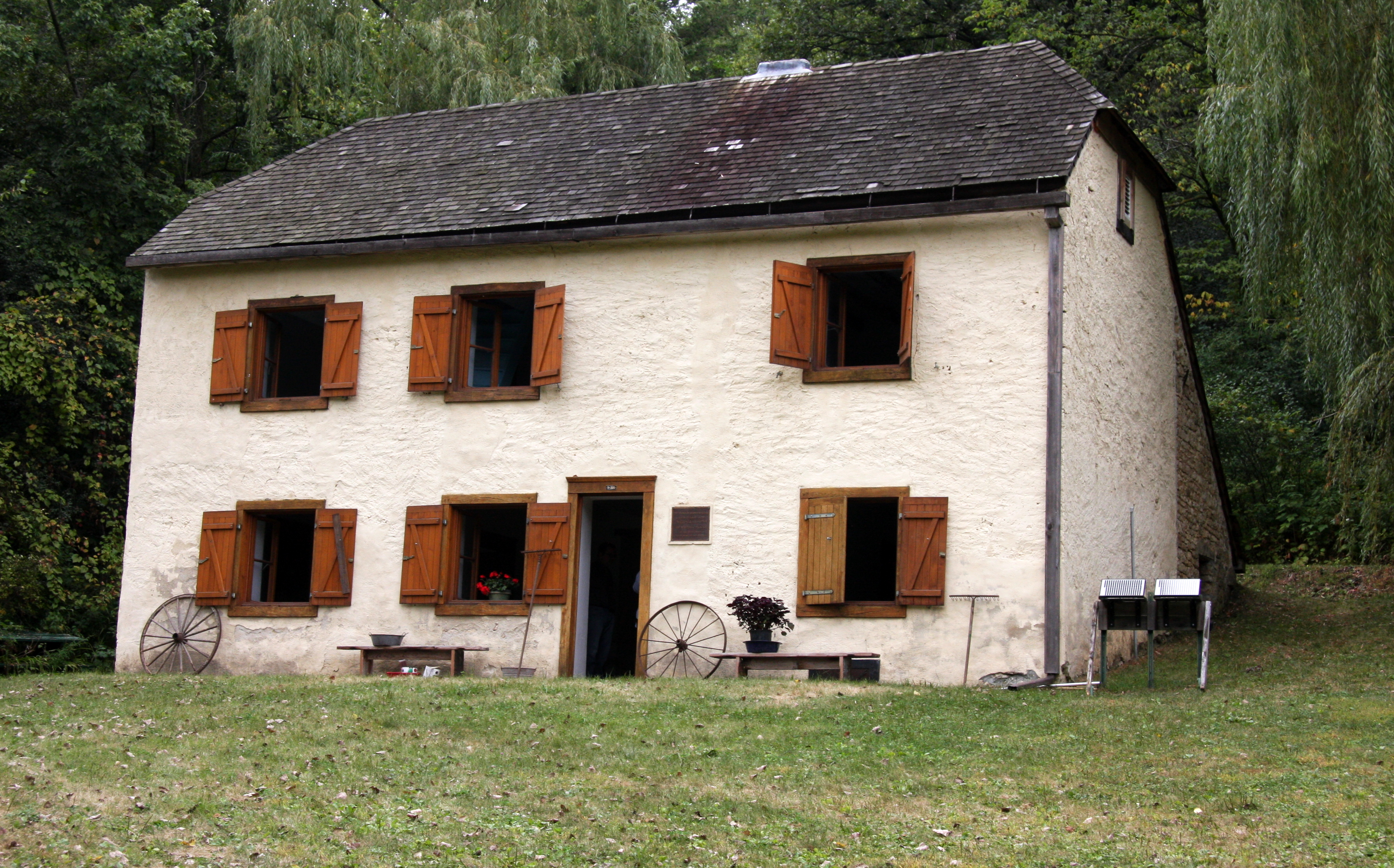
- The Nicholas Marnach House in 2013

- Location within Minnesota Location within the United States
- Location: Off County Highway 26, Whitewater Township, Minnesota
- Coordinates: 44°7′11.4″N 92°1′56.5″W
- Area: 1 acre (0.40 ha)
- Built: 1857–60
- Architect: Nicholas Marnach
- Architectural style: Quereinhaus
- NRHP reference No.: 78003406
- Added to NRHP: January 31, 1978

The Nicholas Marnach House is the restored home of a Luxembourgish pioneer family in Whitewater Township, Minnesota, United States, built 1857–1860. It was listed on the National Register of Historic Places in 1978 for having state-level significance in the themes of architecture and exploration/settlement. It was nominated as Southeast Minnesota's oldest surviving example of the traditional European construction occasionally produced by the region's Germanic immigrants. The house is about three miles (5 km) north of Elba, Minnesota, within the Whitewater Wildlife Management Area, a state wildlife preserve adjacent to Whitewater State Park.

== Description ==
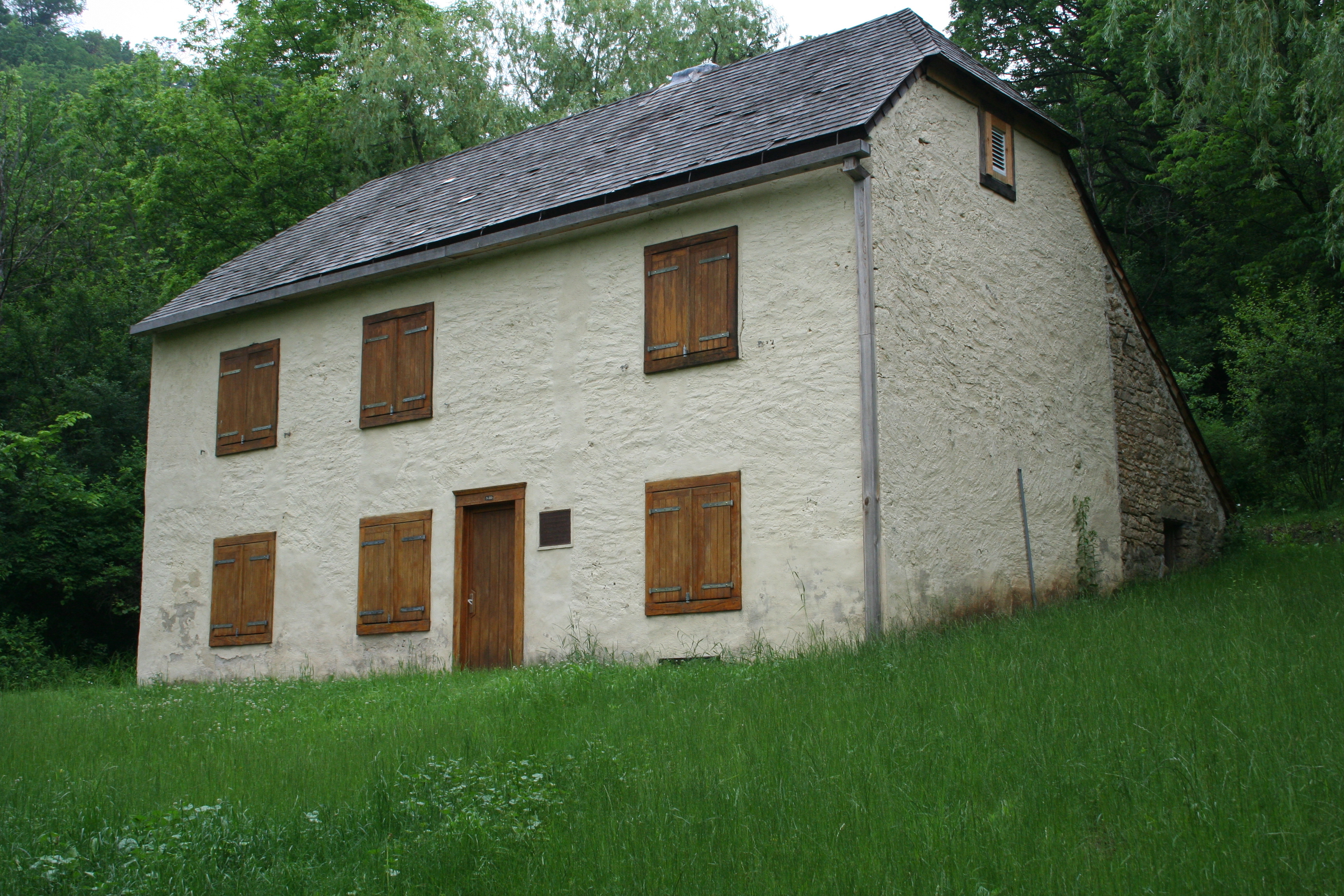
The house seen from the south

The Nicholas Marnach House is a rectangular, two-story building with a rear lean-to set into a hillside. There is an attic under a half-hip roof, and a partial basement under the east half of the house. The walls are constructed of randomly laid limestone covered by thick stucco, and are up to 3 feet (0.91 m) thick. It has three rooms on each floor, each room having a large square window facing south. Narrow staircases provide access between the floors. The attic has smaller windows on either gable, and a layer of concrete poured over the plank flooring as a form of fireproofing. The house is built in the Quereinhaus style that had become popular in rural Luxembourg in the 1840s. The style includes design features in use since medieval times, such as the mortise and tenon timber framing, massive stone walls, stucco façade, square windows, and half-hip roof.

== History ==
John and Mary Marnach, with their son Nicholas, were immigrants from the commune of Rambrouch in Luxembourg. Many of their countrymen had settled in the communities of Elba and Rollingstone in Winona County. Most of the settlers built simple, subsistence-style residences, but the Marnachs opted to employ construction methods hearkening back to medieval Germany. Farmers and stonemasons by trade, they constructed a home for themselves in four stages from 1857 to 1860. The house stood on a stagecoach road between Minneiska and Plainview, Minnesota. It was part of the now-abandoned townsite of Whitewater Falls. A wooden lean-to was added to the rear of the house in 1914.

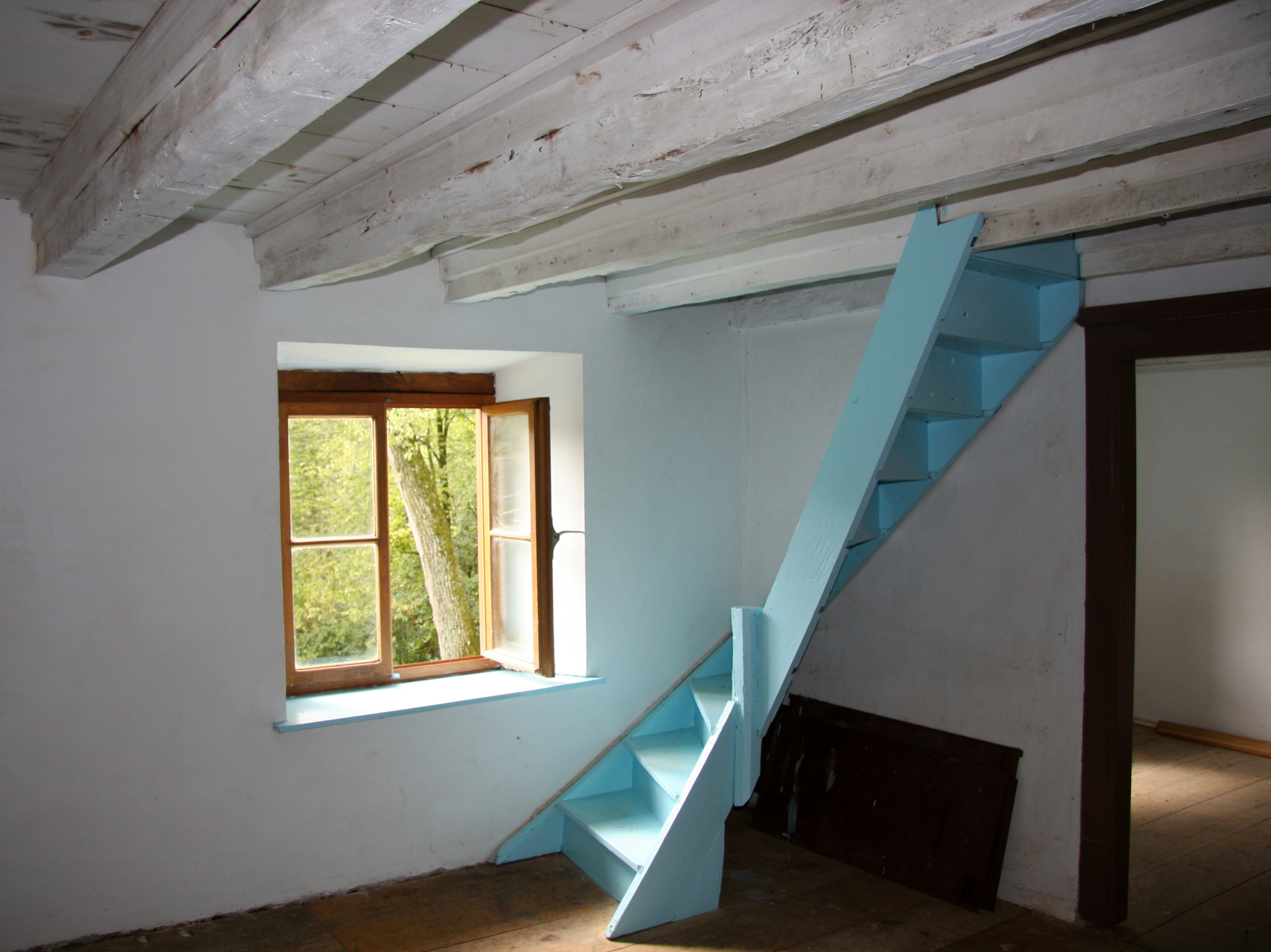
The central room on the second level after restoration with blue painted wooden stairs going to the attic

The house remained occupied for several decades, but by the mid-20th century it stood vacant. It was added to the National Register of Historic Places in January 1978. Descendants of the area's settlers spearheaded an international effort to preserve the deteriorating house, gaining the assistance of the Luxembourgish government and donations collected by Luxembourgish schoolchildren. From 1991 to 1993 craftsmen from Luxembourg worked with local volunteers to restore the Marnach House, replacing the roof, doors, windows, and shutters, reconstructing much of the west wall, replastering the interior, and installing new flooring. On August 12, 1993, the restored house was dedicated in a ceremony that included former Luxembourgish prime minister Pierre Werner.

== Significance ==
The Nicholas Marnach House is the only fieldstone farmhouse of its size and type in Southeast Minnesota. It is also the oldest known surviving example of traditional European construction among the region's pioneer architecture. It is both a testament to the area's Germanic immigrants and a rare vision of northern European architecture transposed to a similar environment in the New World.

== Access ==
The Nicholas Marnach House stands on public land in a state wildlife area, and can be reached by foot year-round. Occasional public events provide wagon or sleigh rides to the house, and guided tours of the interior.

== See also ==
- National Register of Historic Places listings in Winona County, Minnesota
