= Laird, Norton Company Building =

- U.S. National Register of Historic Places
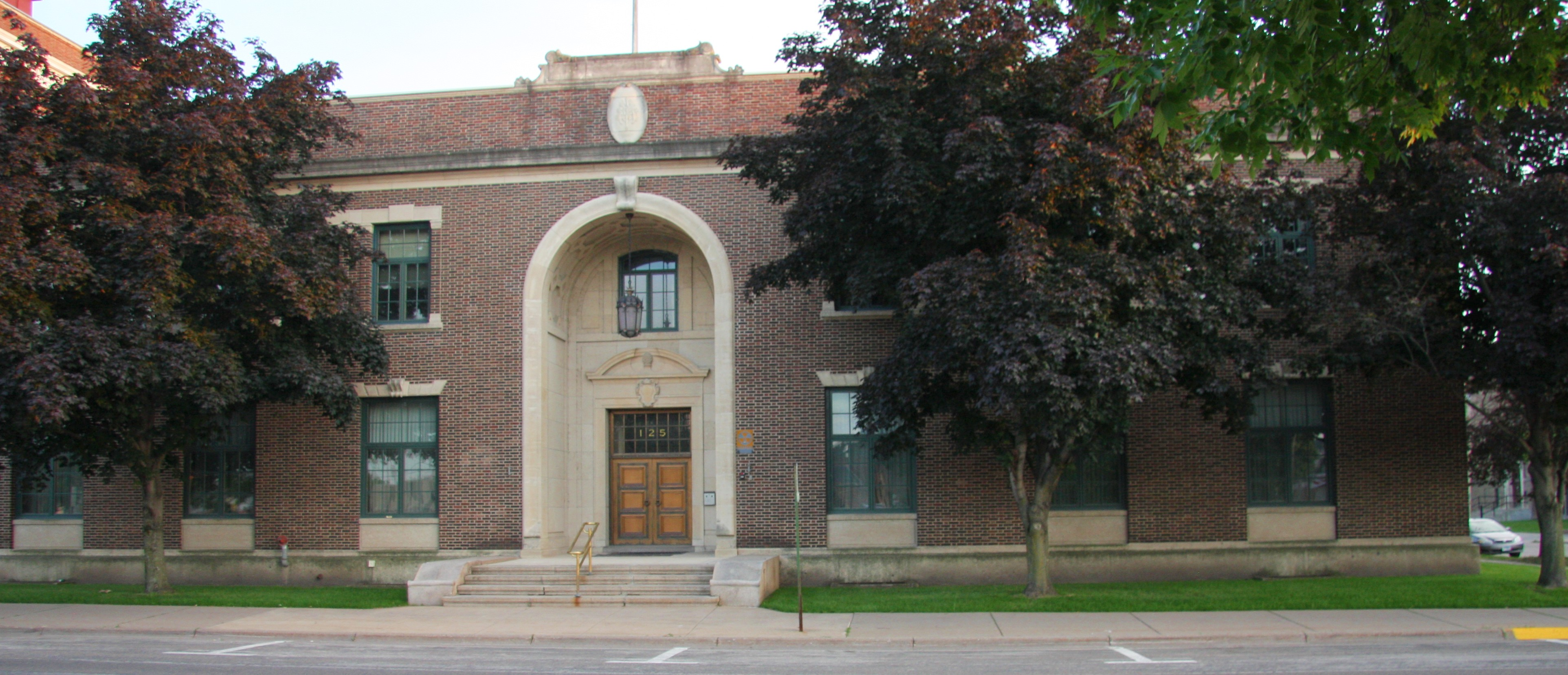
- The Laird, Norton Company Building viewed from the north

- Location within Minnesota Location within the United States
- Location: 125 West 5th Street, Winona, Minnesota
- Coordinates: 44°3′3″N 91°38′24″W
- Area: Less than one acre
- Built: 1917–18
- Built by: Seidlitz & Werner
- Architect: Schmidt, Garden & Martin
- Architectural style: Italian Renaissance Revival
- NRHP reference No.: 14000392
- Designated: July 11, 2014

The Laird, Norton Company Building is a historic commercial building in Winona, Minnesota, United States. From its completion in 1918 to 1958 it was the headquarters of the Laird, Norton Company, the largest and most successful logging firm based in Winona. It was listed on the National Register of Historic Places in 2014 for its local significance in the theme of commerce. It was nominated for its association with the Minnesota lumber industry. The Laird, Norton Company was founded in the 1850s in Winona, a strategic river and rail hub, and pioneered the use of line yards, lumber yards established along railroad lines to sell raw building material to inland settlers.

== See also ==
- National Register of Historic Places listings in Winona County, Minnesota
