= Abner F. Hodgins House =

Historic house in Minnesota, United States

- U.S. National Register of Historic Places
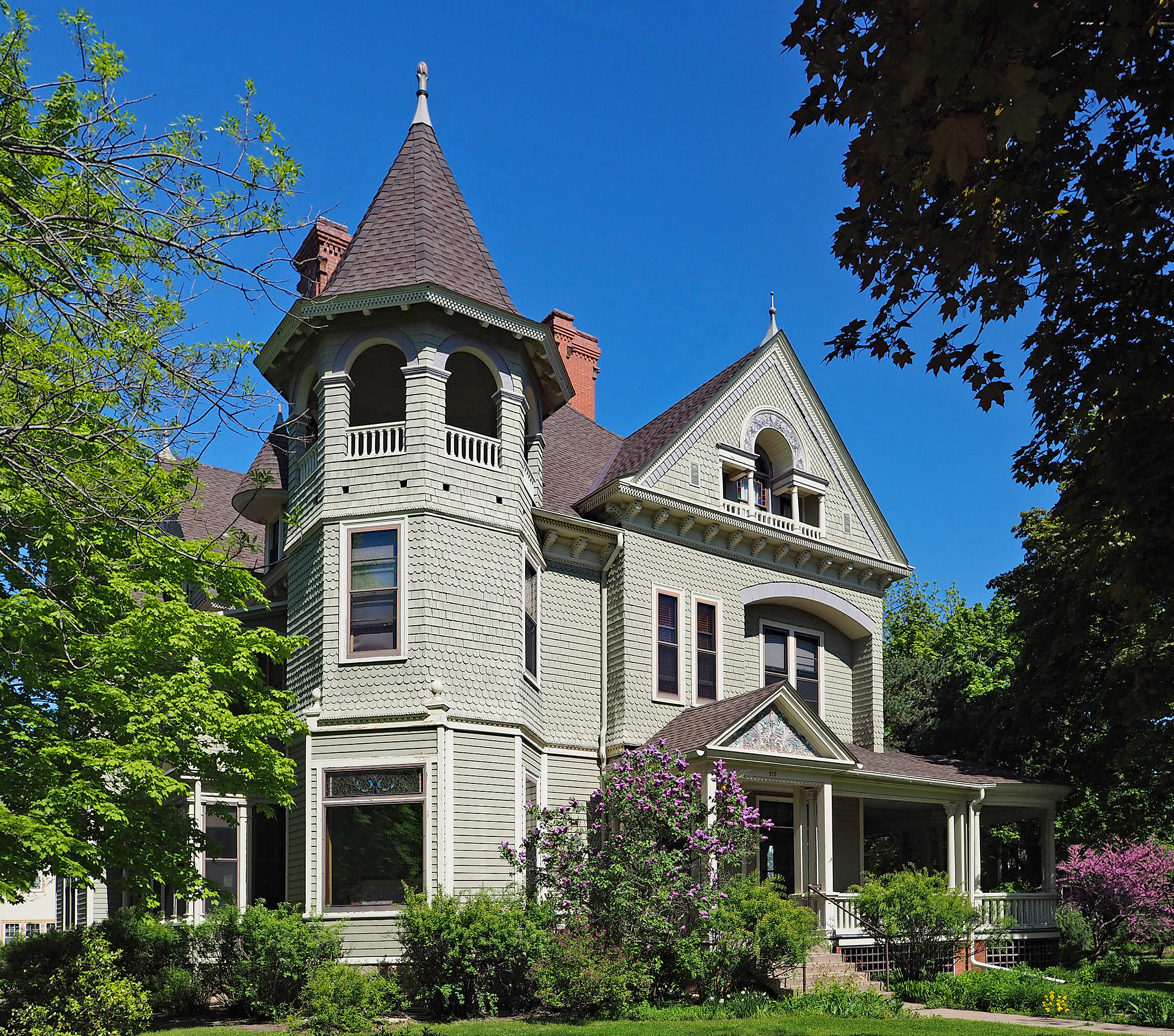
- The Abner F. Hodgins House viewed from the southeast

- Location within Minnesota Location within the United States
- Location: 275 Harriet Street, Winona, Minnesota
- Coordinates: 44°3′7.5″N 91°38′46.5″W
- Area: Less than one acre
- Built: 1890
- Architect: Charles G. Maybury
- Architectural style: Queen Anne
- NRHP reference No.: 84000248
- Designated: November 8, 1984

The Abner F. Hodgins House is a historic house in Winona, Minnesota, United States. It was built in 1890 for Hodgins (1826–1896), a successful lumber executive. The house was listed on the National Register of Historic Places in 1984 for its local significance in the themes of architecture and industry. It was nominated for being an outstanding example of a Queen Anne-style house and for being the home of a notable leader in the key industry behind Winona's early prominence.

== See also ==
- National Register of Historic Places listings in Winona County, Minnesota
