= National Register of Historic Places listings in Winona County, Minnesota =

Location of Winona County in Minnesota

This is a list of the National Register of Historic Places listings in Winona County, Minnesota. It is intended to be a complete list of the properties and districts on the National Register of Historic Places in Winona County, Minnesota, United States. The locations of National Register properties and districts for which the latitude and longitude coordinates are included below, may be seen in an online map.

There are 49 properties and districts listed on the National Register in the county. A supplementary list includes four additional sites that were formerly listed on the National Register.

This National Park Service list is complete through NPS recent listings posted August 14, 2026.

== Current listings ==
	Name on the Register	Image	Date listed	Location	City or town	Description
1	Anger's Block	Anger's Block	January 31, 1978 (#78001571)	116–120 Walnut St. 44°03′07″N 91°38′01″W	Winona	1872 commercial building, one of the oldest still standing in Winona's central business district. Also a contributing property to the Winona Commercial Historic District.
2	Willard Bunnell House	Willard Bunnell House	April 23, 1973 (#73000998)	36106 Old Homer Rd. 44°01′20″N 91°33′35″W	Homer	Minnesota's first permanent house south of Saint Paul, built in 1849. Also noted for its Gothic Revival architecture with regional river valley features and its association with pioneer brothers Willard (1814–1861) and Lafayette Bunnell (1824–1903). Now a house museum.
3	Central Grade School	Central Grade School	March 6, 2012 (#12000071)	317 Market St. 44°02′53″N 91°38′05″W	Winona	1930 elementary school, one of five new facilities built by Winona Public Schools to implement progressive educational reforms such as separated grades, kindergartens, gymnasiums, art and music classrooms, and improved hygiene and fire safety features.
4	Chicago, Milwaukee and St. Paul Railway Station	Chicago, Milwaukee and St. Paul Railway Station	May 28, 2013 (#13000327)	65 E. Mark St. 44°02′39″N 91°38′24″W	Winona	Long-serving 1888 railway station representing the development of train transportation in Minnesota with Winona as a major rail hub. Now the Winona Amtrak station.
5	Choate Department Store	Choate Department Store	June 3, 1976 (#76001079)	51 E. 3rd St. 44°03′07″N 91°38′11″W	Winona	1881 commercial building of Hannibal Choate (1835–1923), prominent and influential early merchant of southeast Minnesota. Also a contributing property to the Winona Commercial Historic District.
6	Church of Saint Stanislaus-Catholic	Church of Saint Stanislaus-Catholic	November 8, 1984 (#84000251)	624 E. 4th St. 44°02′49″N 91°37′20″W	Winona	1895 Romanesque Revival church built by Minnesota's largest Polish American community; one of Winona's most prominent architectural landmarks. Now termed the Basilica of Saint Stanislaus Kostka.
7	Church of the Holy Trinity-Catholic	Church of the Holy Trinity-Catholic	August 9, 1984 (#84001721)	83 Main St. 44°05′52″N 91°49′08″W	Rollingstone	1869 church expanded in 1893, noted for its Gothic Revival architecture and central role in the religious, social, and—through its associated parochial school—academic life in a Luxembourg American community.
8	East Second Street Commercial Historic District	East Second Street Commercial Historic District	January 25, 1991 (#90002198)	66–78 Center, 54–78 E. 2nd, and 67–71 Lafayette Sts. 44°03′12″N 91°38′07″W	Winona	One of Minnesota's few surviving remnants of a river town's original business district—with 14 contributing properties on one block mostly built in the late 1860s—and a symbol of Winona's swift growth as a lumber and grain center.
9	Benjamin Ellsworth House	Benjamin Ellsworth House	August 9, 1984 (#84001718)	100 U.S. Highway 14; 43°58′43″N 91°57′23″W	Utica	1873 Italianate house of Utica's founder Benjamin Ellsworth (1826–1890).
10	First Congregational Church	First Congregational Church	April 29, 2021 (#100006440)	161 W. Broadway St. 44°03′00″N 91°38′29″W	Winona	1882 church noted for its transitional High Victorian Gothic/Richardsonian Romanesque architecture. Listing also includes an 1891 Victorian parsonage and 1934 Colonial Revival sextonage.
11	Dr. J. W. S. Gallagher House	Dr. J. W. S. Gallagher House	November 8, 1984 (#84000245)	451 W. Broadway St. 44°03′08″N 91°38′56″W	Winona	Well-preserved example—built in 1913—of the modest residential commissions designed by the noted Prairie School architectural firm of Purcell & Elmslie.
12	Grain and Lumber Exchange Building	Grain and Lumber Exchange Building	December 2, 1977 (#77000774)	51 E. 4th St. 44°03′04″N 91°38′13″W	Winona	Exemplary Renaissance Revival office building constructed in 1900.
13	William Hemmelberg House	William Hemmelberg House	October 23, 1986 (#86002916)	County Highways 26 and 37; 44°05′20″N 91°59′30″W	Elba vicinity	Stone farmhouse built circa 1858 and expanded circa 1870, a rare surviving vestige of the Whitewater Valley's early pioneers.
14	Abner F. Hodgins House	Abner F. Hodgins House	November 8, 1984 (#84000248)	275 Harriet St. 44°03′08″N 91°38′46″W	Winona	Exemplary 1890 Queen Anne house of lumberman Abner F. Hodgins (1826–1896), a notable leader in the key industry behind Winona's early prominence. Also a contributing property to the Windom Park Residential Historic District.
15	Holy Trinity School	Holy Trinity School	April 16, 2026 (#100010636)	101 Broadway St. 44°05′54″N 91°49′07″W	Rollingstone	1920 school with an addition built 1949–50; Rollingstone's sole educational facility from its construction until 1996, alternately and at times jointly housing public and parochial schools.
16	Huff-Lamberton House	Huff-Lamberton House	December 12, 1976 (#76001080)	207 Huff St. 44°03′11″N 91°38′39″W	Winona	One of Minnesota's oldest and best preserved Italian Villa style houses, built in 1857 and given a Moorish Revival porch in 1873. Also a contributing property to the Windom Park Residential Historic District.
17	Jefferson School	Jefferson School	March 6, 2012 (#12000072)	1268 W. 5th St. 44°03′16″N 91°40′16″W	Winona	1938 elementary school, one of five new facilities built by Winona Public Schools to implement progressive educational reforms. Also noted for its Public Works Administration funding and Art Moderne architecture.
18	Kirch/Latch Building	Kirch/Latch Building	May 21, 1975 (#75001036)	114–122 E. 2nd St. 44°03′10″N 91°38′02″W	Winona	Circa-1868 commercial building noted for its transitional Gothic Revival/Italianate architecture and occupation by the largest of several produce wholesalers based in Winona to take advantage of its river and rail connections.
19	Laird, Norton Company Building	Laird, Norton Company Building	July 11, 2014 (#14000392)	125 W. 5th St. 44°03′03″N 91°38′24″W	Winona	Headquarters 1918–1958 of a major lumber company established in the 1850s, which milled logs from northern pineries and distributed them via railside lumber yards in southern Minnesota and South Dakota.
20	Lake Park Bandshell	Lake Park Bandshell	July 18, 2023 (#100009129)	Lake Park Dr., east of intersection with Main St. 44°02′26″N 91°38′29″W	Winona	1924 municipal bandshell noted for its singular Neoclassical architecture and long service as Winona's primary outdoor music venue.
21	Madison School	Madison School	March 6, 2012 (#12000073)	515 W. Wabasha St. 44°03′06″N 91°39′05″W	Winona	1932 elementary school, one of five new facilities built by Winona Public Schools to implement progressive educational reforms such as separated grades, kindergartens, gymnasiums, art and music classrooms, and improved hygiene and fire safety.
22	Nicholas Marnach House	Nicholas Marnach House	January 30, 1978 (#78003406)	Off County Highway 26 in Whitewater Wildlife Management Area; 44°07′11″N 92°01′57″W	Elba vicinity	Circa-1857 stuccoed stone house, oldest surviving example of the traditional European construction occasionally produced by Germanic immigrants to Southeast Minnesota.
23	Merchants National Bank	Merchants National Bank	October 16, 1974 (#74001045)	102 E. 3rd St. 44°03′08″N 91°38′06″W	Winona	Leading example of the Prairie School banks designed by Purcell, Feick & Elmslie, constructed in 1912; a significant influence on early-20th-century American architecture. Also a contributing property to the Winona Commercial Historic District.
24	Model School Building and College Hall of the Winona Normal School	Model School Building and College Hall of the Winona Normal School	December 3, 2013 (#13000884)	416 Washington & 151 W. Sanborn Sts. 44°02′52″N 91°38′34″W	Winona	1915 and 1924 laboratory school buildings of Minnesota's first normal school, active 1860–1971. Now Winona State University's Phelps Hall and Somsen Hall.
25	Pickwick Mill	Pickwick Mill	September 22, 1970 (#70000314)	24813 County Rd. 7; 43°58′49″N 91°29′48″W	Pickwick	One of southeast Minnesota's oldest surviving water-powered gristmills, built in 1854. Now a non-profit historic attraction.
26	Rollingstone Village Hall	Rollingstone Village Hall	April 5, 2021 (#100006357)	98 Main St. 44°05′51″N 91°49′04″W	Rollingstone	Municipal hall housing all local government services 1900–1962, and a meeting venue critical to the area's land management and Luxembourg American identity. Now a museum.
27	Saint Charles City Bakery	Saint Charles City Bakery	August 9, 1984 (#84001723)	501 Whitewater Ave. 43°58′22″N 92°03′53″W	St. Charles	1876 commercial building, last remnant of St. Charles' original business district, which was lost to an 1891 fire and relocation to a more central, trackside location.
28	Schlitz Hotel	Schlitz Hotel	August 26, 1982 (#82003087)	129 W. 3rd St. 44°03′10″N 91°38′21″W	Winona	1892 hotel and café established by the Joseph Schlitz Brewing Company, a well-preserved example of a once-common business venture by breweries. Also a contributing property to the Winona Commercial Historic District.
29	Sugar Loaf	Sugar Loaf	August 3, 1990 (#90001164)	Southwest of U.S. Highway 61 and Minnesota State Highway 43; 44°01′42″N 91°37′36″W	Winona	500-foot-high (150 m) river bluff with a distinctive pinnacle created by 19th-century quarrying; one of Minnesota's most famous landmarks to travelers and tourists since the 1870s.
30	Sugar Loaf Brewery	Sugar Loaf Brewery	March 31, 1978 (#78001572)	1023 Sugar Loaf Rd. 44°01′44″N 91°37′27″W	Winona	Brewery complex with storage caves dug into Sugar Loaf, associated with prominent local brewer Peter Bub and his successors, who produced beer on the site 1872–1969.
31	Trinity Episcopal Church	Trinity Episcopal Church	August 9, 1984 (#84001726)	805 Saint Charles Ave. 43°58′11″N 92°03′58″W	St. Charles	1874 Carpenter Gothic church significant for its well-preserved interior and exterior.
32	Trinity Episcopal Church	Trinity Episcopal Church	August 9, 1984 (#84001727)	8110 W. Main St. 44°01′39″N 91°45′56″W	Stockton	1859 church noted for its well-preserved Carpenter Gothic architecture and shared importance to a community established by American-born settlers but later dominated by German immigrants.
33	Washington-Kosciusko School	Washington-Kosciusko School	March 6, 2012 (#12000074)	365 Mankato Ave. 44°02′33″N 91°37′10″W	Winona	1934 elementary school, one of five new facilities built by Winona Public Schools to implement progressive educational reforms. Also noted for its funding by the Public Works Administration, the New Deal's largest relief program.
34	J.R. Watkins Medical Company Complex	J.R. Watkins Medical Company Complex	December 4, 2004 (#84003940)	150 Liberty St. 44°02′58″N 91°37′42″W	Winona	Longtime headquarters of the nation's largest direct sales company in the early 20th century, with seven contributing properties built 1900–1914, including a 1911 Prairie School building designed by George W. Maher.
35	Paul Watkins House	Paul Watkins House	November 8, 1984 (#84000255)	175 E. Wabasha St. 44°02′49″N 91°38′07″W	Winona	Jacobethan house built 1924–27, designed by architect Ralph Adams Cram for Paul Watkins (1865–1931), second-generation leader of the J.R. Watkins Company and progenitor of its famous door-to-door sales strategy.
36	Whitewater Avenue Commercial Historic District	Whitewater Avenue Commercial Historic District	August 9, 1984 (#84001736)	900–1012 Whitewater Ave. 43°58′08″N 92°03′54″W	St. Charles	Architecturally cohesive row of seven commercial buildings constructed 1890–1901.
37	Whitewater State Park CCC/WPA/Rustic Style Historic Resources	Whitewater State Park CCC/WPA/Rustic Style Historic Resources	October 25, 1989 (#89001661)	Off Minnesota State Highway 74; 44°03′15″N 92°02′45″W	Elba vicinity	Park facilities with 29 contributing properties built 1934–41, significant as examples of New Deal federal work relief, diverse National Park Service rustic design, and landscape architecture on a challenging site.
38	Windom Park Residential Historic District	Windom Park Residential Historic District	October 13, 2021 (#100007069)	Roughly bounded by W. 5th, Huff, W. Broadway, Harriet, and Wilson Sts. 44°03′06″N 91°38′46″W	Winona	Late-19th and early-20th-century mansions surrounding a park, the preferred neighborhood for multiple generations of Winona's upper class, exhibiting high architectural styles on 25 contributing properties built 1857–1912.
39	Winona and St. Peter Engine House	Winona and St. Peter Engine House	January 12, 1984 (#84001730)	75 Gould St. 44°03′26″N 91°40′07″W	Winona	Circa-1890 engine house, sole surviving structure of a railroad shop complex that was a major local employer and a component of the rail network that fueled Winona's economy.
40	Winona and St. Peter Railroad Freight House	Winona and St. Peter Railroad Freight House	January 26, 1984 (#84001733)	58 Center St. 44°03′14″N 91°38′06″W	Winona	Freight warehouse built 1882–3 by the Winona and St. Peter Railroad, which was instrumental in spurring Winona's industry and growth by developing markets along its rail lines across Minnesota and into Dakota Territory.
41	Winona Athletic Club	Winona Athletic Club	July 24, 2020 (#100005359)	773 E. 5th St. 44°02′41″N 91°37′05″W	Winona	1931 athletic center of a fraternal organization formed in 1898, the secondmost important social center for Winona's East End Polish American community after the Basilica of Saint Stanislaus Kostka.
42	Winona City Hall	Winona City Hall	July 8, 1999 (#99000806)	207 Lafayette St. 44°03′03″N 91°38′10″W	Winona	Exceptional 1939 Classical Moderne city hall funded by the Public Works Administration, a local example of the massive federal relief efforts of the New Deal.
43	Winona Commercial Historic District	Winona Commercial Historic District	October 1, 1998 (#98001220)	3rd St. between Franklin and Johnson Streets; also 102 Walnut St. and 159 East Second St., and alley behind buildings to the south 44°03′07″N 91°38′07″W	Winona	Six-block downtown reflecting the prosperity of a river and rail town that grew into southeast Minnesota's leading commercial center of the late 19th century, with 65 contributing properties built 1868–1920. A boundary increase was approved June 4, 2020.
44	Winona County Courthouse	Winona County Courthouse	December 2, 1970 (#70000313)	171 W. 3rd St. 44°03′10″N 91°38′25″W	Winona	1889 Romanesque Revival county courthouse, an artistic manifestation of Winona's prosperous riverboat and logging era.
45	Winona Free Public Library	Winona Free Public Library	July 29, 1977 (#77000775)	151 W. 5th St. 44°03′04″N 91°38′27″W	Winona	1899 Neoclassical public library noted for its architectural and cultural significance; specifically designed to house public art along with library services.
46	Winona High School and Winona Junior High School	Winona High School and Winona Junior High School	January 2, 2004 (#03001350)	166 and 218 W. Broadway; 44°03′03″N 91°38′31″W	Winona	Adjacent schools completed in 1917 and 1926, representative of local efforts to implement progressive educational trends in updated facilities, while a 1928 auditorium hosted local and national touring performances.
47	Winona Hotel	Winona Hotel	March 31, 1983 (#83000947)	157 W. 3rd St. 44°03′11″N 91°38′23″W	Winona	1889 Romanesque Revival hotel built to accommodate visitors during Winona's heyday as a fine theatre destination. Also a contributing property to the Winona Commercial Historic District.
48	Winona Masonic Temple	Winona Masonic Temple	February 26, 1998 (#98000152)	255 Main St. 44°03′03″N 91°38′21″W	Winona	Masonic Temple built 1908–9, the headquarters of a fraternal organization important to Winona's civic and social development. Also noted for its large, intact collection of theatrical backdrops and stage equipment.
49	Winona Savings Bank Building	Winona Savings Bank Building	September 15, 1977 (#77000776)	204 Main St. 44°03′05″N 91°38′18″W	Winona	Bank constructed 1914–16; the state's largest and best preserved Egyptian Revival building of the early 20th century and one of architect George W. Maher's master works in Minnesota.

== Former listings ==
	Name on the Register	Image	Date listed	Date removed	Location	City or town	Description
1	Bridge No. L1409	Bridge No. L1409	July 5, 1990 (#90000978)	November 7, 2016	Hillsdale Township Road 62 over Garvin Brook	Winona vicinity	1895 stone arch bridge, called the state's "most impressive" rural specimen for its fine ashlar masonry and 45-foot (14 m) span. Destroyed in the 2007 Midwest flooding.
2	E. L. King House (Rockledge)		September 26, 1982 (#82003086)	May 7, 1990	U.S. Route 61	Winona vicinity	1911 Prairie School house. Demolished in 1988.
3	James P. Pearson Steamboat/Julius C. Wilkie Steamboat	James P. Pearson Steamboat/Julius C. Wilkie Steamboat	June 11, 1975 (#75001035)	June 25, 1986	Foot of Main St. at Mississippi River (Levee Park)	Winona	Destroyed by arson on March 12, 1981.
4	Stockton Mill		May 12, 1975 (#75001034)	May 7, 1990	8th St.	Stockton	1890 mill. Destroyed by arson on November 25, 1988.

== See also ==
- List of National Historic Landmarks in Minnesota
- National Register of Historic Places listings in Minnesota
