= Winona Public Library =

Library in Minnesota, U.S.

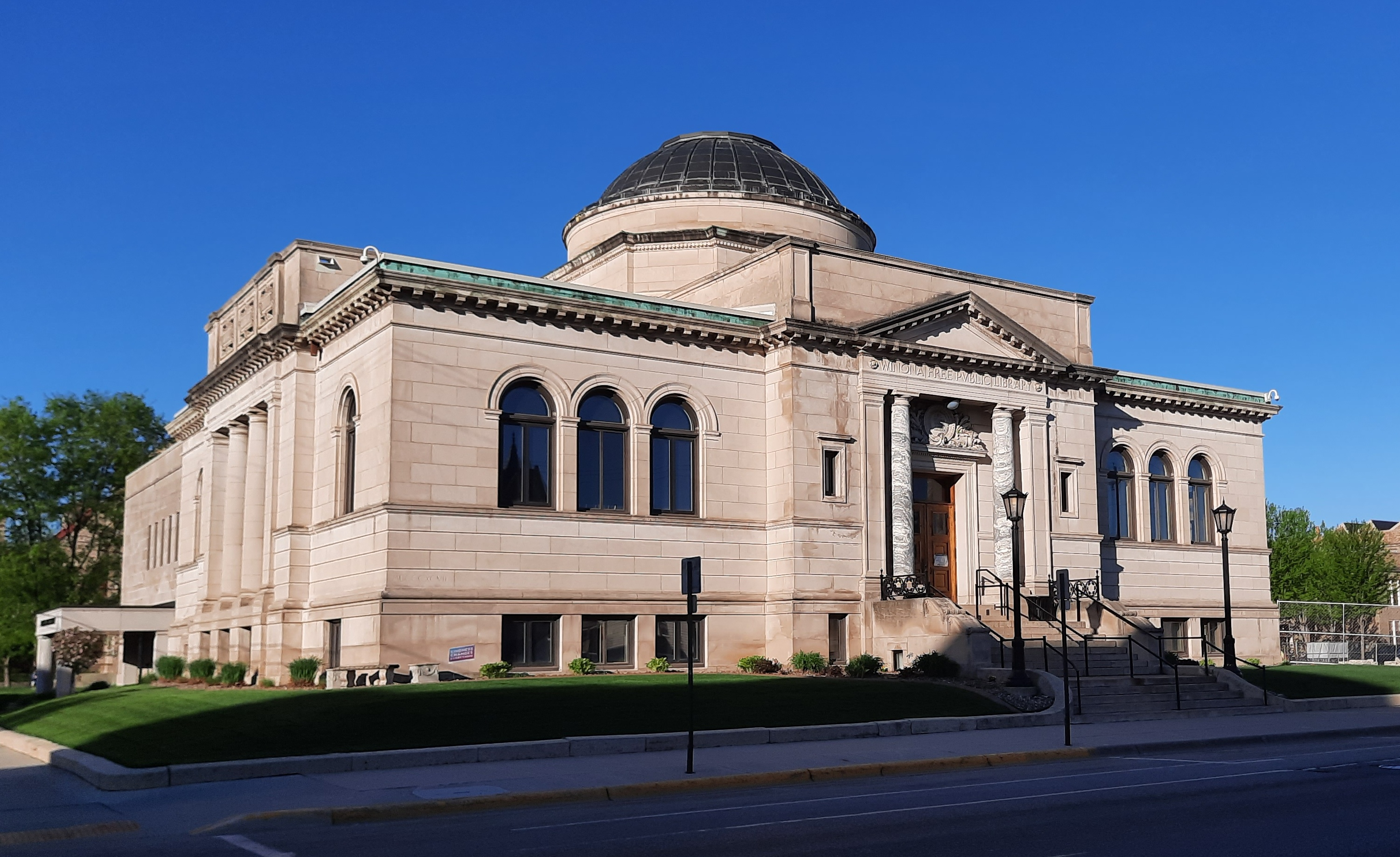
- Winona Public Library from the northeast
- 44°3′4″N 91°38′26″W
- Location: 151 West Fifth Street, Winona, Minnesota, United States
- Type: Public library
- Established: 1886
- Architect: Warren Powers Laird

Collection
- Size: 73,000

Other information
- Public transit access: Winona Transit Service
- Website: https://winona.lib.mn.us/
- Winona Free Public Library
- U.S. National Register of Historic Places
- Area: Less than one acre
- Built: 1899
- Architect: Warren Powers Laird, Edgar Viguers Seeler
- Architectural style: Neoclassical
- NRHP reference No.: 77000775
- Added to NRHP: July 29, 1977

The Winona Public Library is the public library serving Winona, Minnesota, United States. It is a member of Southeastern Libraries Cooperating, a Minnesota library region. Housed in an 1899 Neoclassical building, the Winona Public Library was listed on the National Register of Historic Places in 1977 for having local significance in architecture and education. It is Minnesota's oldest library to continuously operate in a purpose-built facility.

== History ==
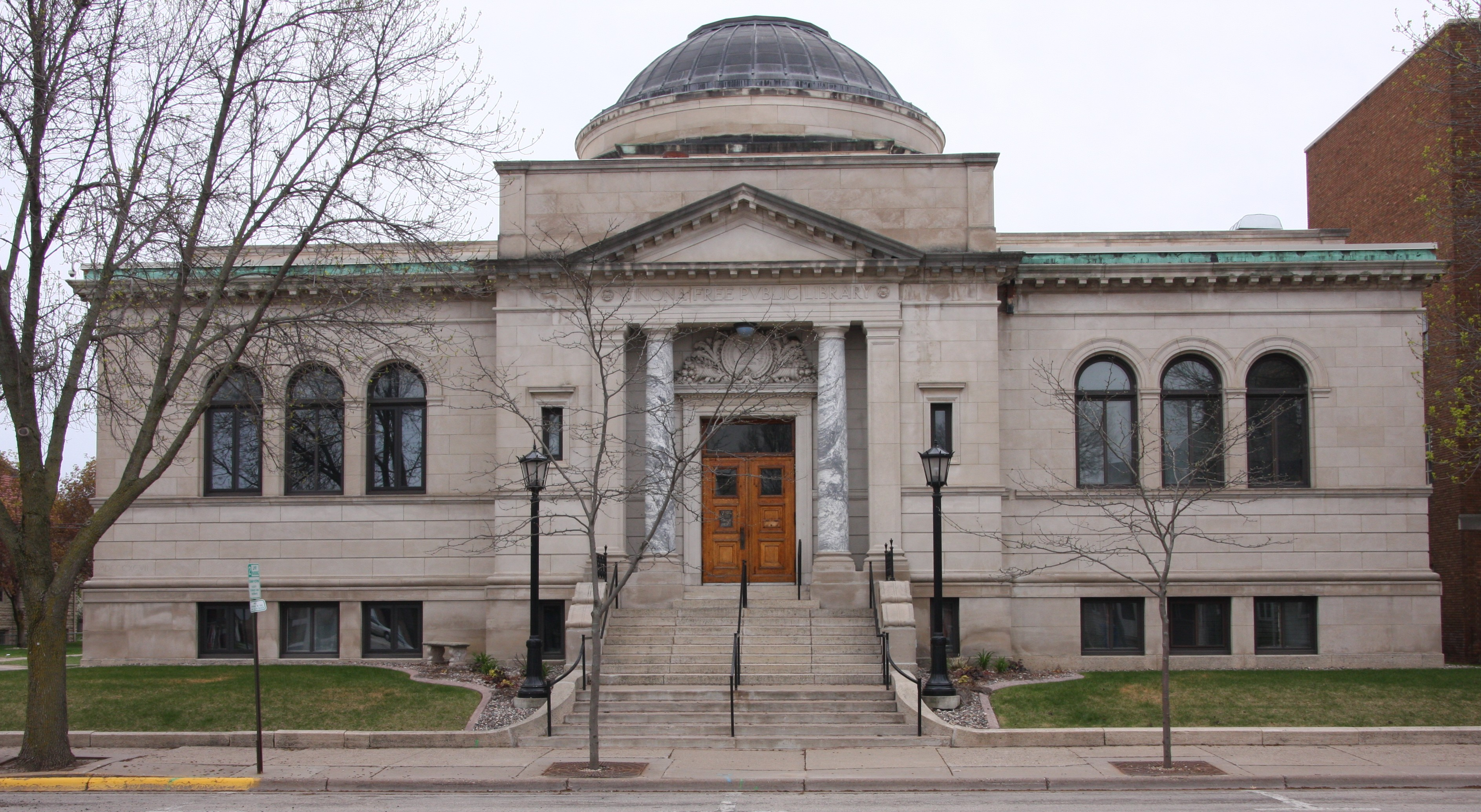
Winona Public Library's original Fifth Street entrance

Library services in Winona originated in 1857 when a local group formed the Winona Lyceum, a membership-based library funded by dues. The group changed its name to the Young Men's Library Association in 1863, and by 1870 had grown to 268 members and 1,670 books. However the library association had to close in 1875 due to debts. Two years later three local women cleared the debt and reorganized the library under a new name, the Winona Library Association. On March 22, 1886, the association donated its collection of 3,500 books to Winona, forming the city's first free public library.

In the late 1890s, local lumber magnate William H. Laird donated $50,000 to the city to cover construction costs of a permanent home for the library. The library association paid for the furniture, fixtures, and shelving. The domed Neoclassical building was designed by Warren Powers Laird, dean of the school of architecture of the University of Pennsylvania, and Edgar Viguers Seeler, a prominent Philadelphia architect. The original building measured 85 by 65 feet (26 by 20 m) with a 56-foot-high (17 m) dome and a three-story collection wing. The brick walls are faced with Indiana Limestone while the entrance steps, curbs, and walks are built from local Winona limestone. The columns at the historic Fifth Street entrance are Creole marble from Georgia.

The library's design specifically included space for public art, including a display gallery, murals, statuary, and glass art. Library features include glass floors in the book stacks and ornate copper-faced shelving and stairs. Artwork includes the Kenyon Cox mural The Light of Learning and a marble copy of Antonio Canova's sculpture Hebe.

Winona Public Library added a children's department in 1921 and by 1949 had begun collecting magazines and newspapers. A 1987 remodeling project moved the entrance from Fifth Street to Johnson Street for improved accessibility.

== See also ==
- National Register of Historic Places listings in Winona County, Minnesota
