= Madison Elementary School (Winona, Minnesota) =

- Madison School
- U.S. National Register of Historic Places
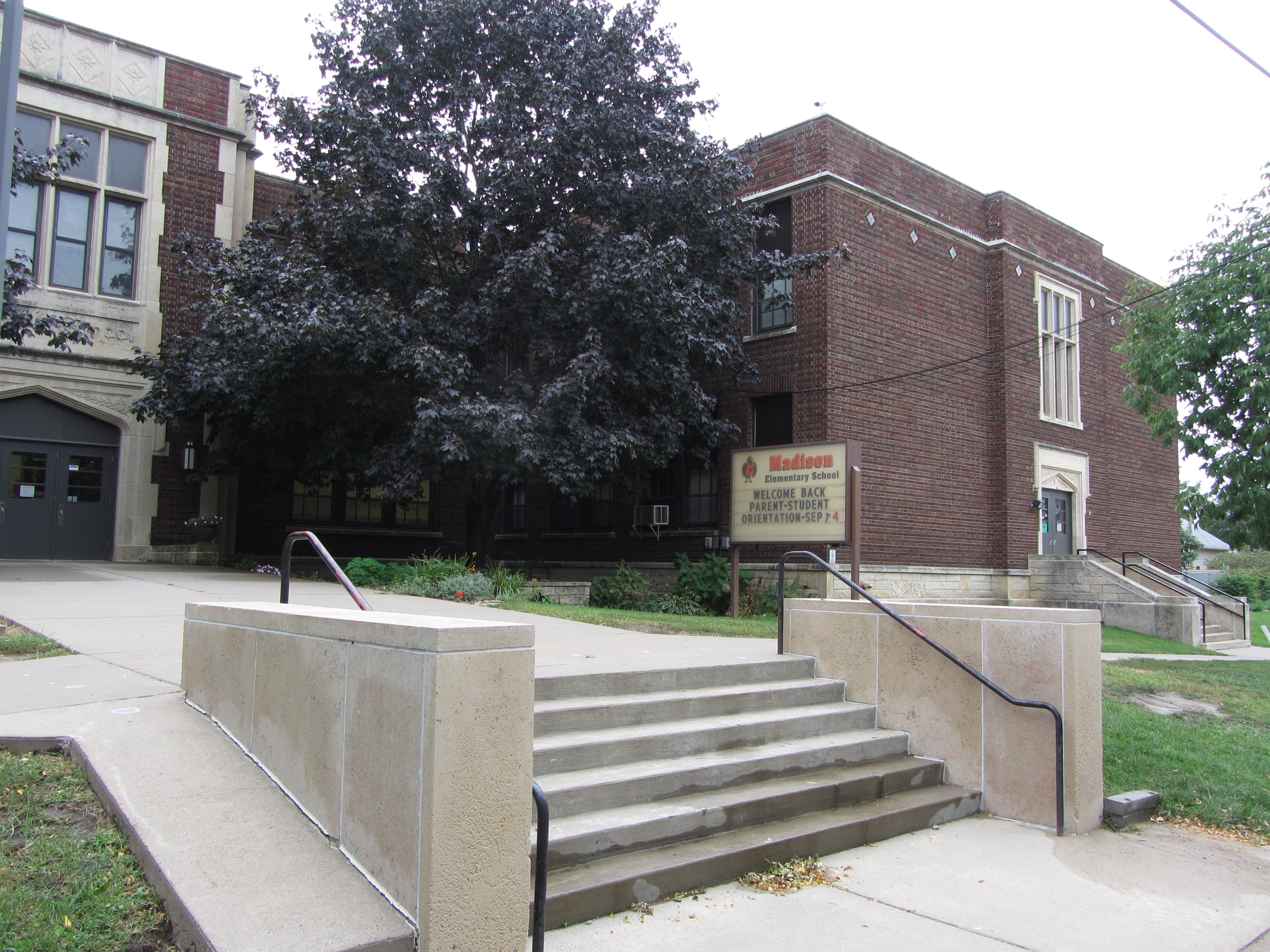
- Madison School viewed from the northeast

- Location within Minnesota Location within the United States
- Location: 515 West Wabasha Street, Winona, Minnesota
- Coordinates: 44°3′6″N 91°39′5″W
- Area: 2.08 acres (0.84 ha)
- Built: 1932
- Built by: T. S. Willis
- Architect: Boyum, Schubert & Sorensen
- Architectural style: Late Gothic Revival
- NRHP reference No.: 12000073
- Designated: March 6, 2012

Madison Elementary School was an elementary school in Winona, Minnesota, United States. The building was constructed in 1932, the third of five new facilities built by Winona Public Schools in the early 20th century. It was listed on the National Register of Historic Places in 2012 for its local significance in the theme of education. It was nominated for representing the efforts of Winona Public Schools to implement progressive educational reforms such as separated grades, kindergartens, gymnasiums, art and music classrooms, and improved hygiene and fire safety.

Due to budgetary shortfalls, the school building was sold to a private buyer in 2018.

== See also ==
- National Register of Historic Places listings in Winona County, Minnesota
