= Winona County Courthouse =

- U.S. National Register of Historic Places
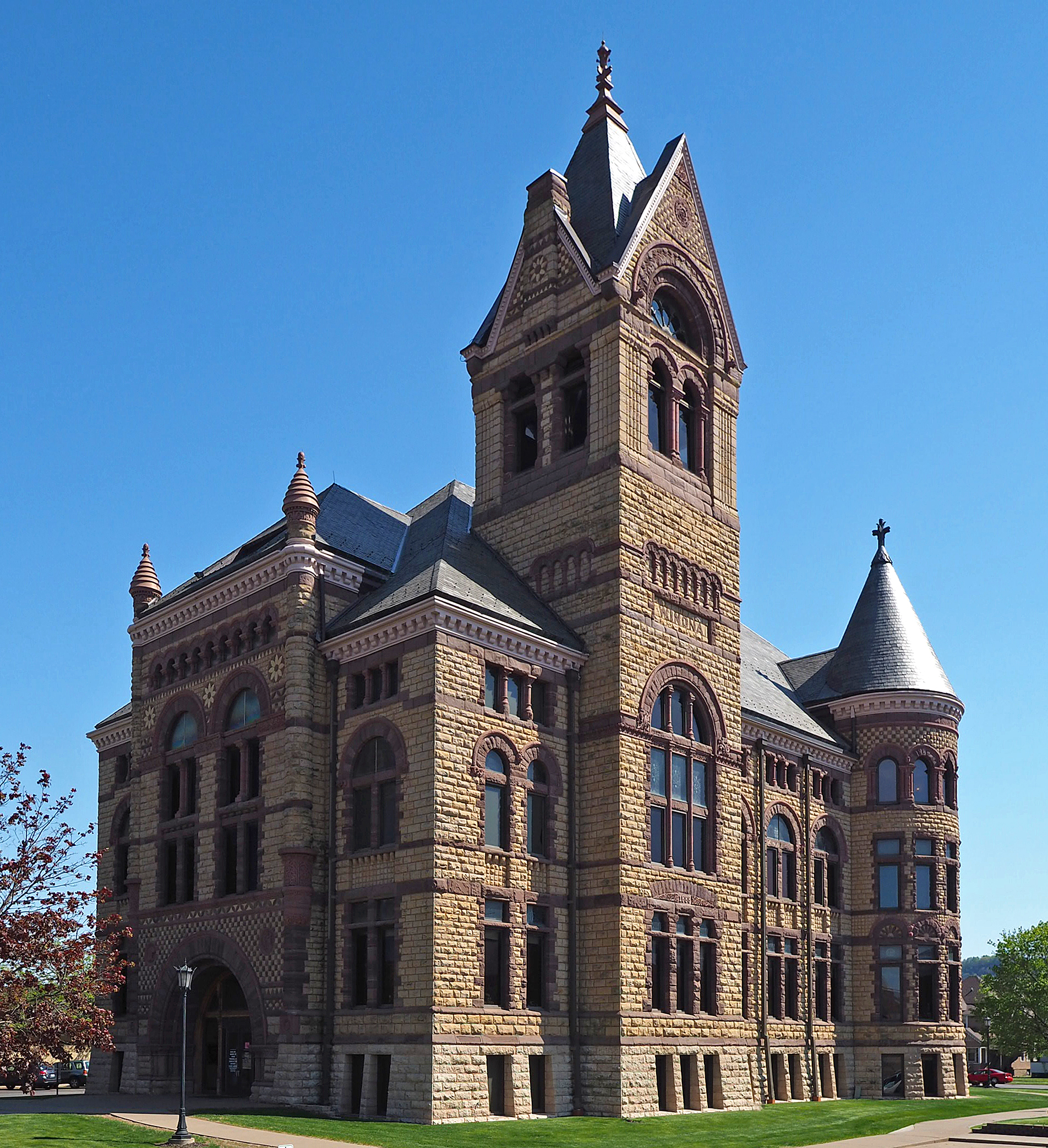
- The Winona County Courthouse from the northwest

- Location within Minnesota Location within the United States
- Location: 171 W. 3rd Street, Winona, Minnesota
- Coordinates: 44°3′10.5″N 91°38′25.5″W
- Area: Less than one acre
- Built: 1889
- Architect: C.G. Maybury and Son
- Architectural style: Richardsonian Romanesque
- NRHP reference No.: 70000313
- Added to NRHP: December 2, 1970

The Winona County Courthouse is the seat of government for Winona County in Winona, Minnesota, United States. The 1889 Richardsonian Romanesque building was listed on the National Register of Historic Places in 1970 for having local significance in the themes of architecture, art, and politics/government. It was nominated for being an artistic manifestation of Winona's prosperous riverboat and logging era. It was the first courthouse in Minnesota listed on the National Register.

== Restoration ==
The original cost of the courthouse was $125,000. From the 1970s to 2000, nearly $2.5 million was spent restoring and remodeling the building, but on September 3, 2000, the ceiling of a fourth floor courtroom collapsed and broke fire sprinkler pipes, resulting in flooding the building with over 4,500 US gallons (17,000 L) of water and causing much other damage. The county offices were relocated to other buildings, and the building was again renovated to repair water damage and to bring the building up to current standards. Insurance paid for over half the cost of repairs, and the Minnesota Historical Society contributed $50,000 for exterior work. The renovation also returned much of the building to its original appearance, including the old fireplaces. The total cost of interior renovation was $5.6 million, with another $1.5 million spent on external renovation.

== See also ==
- List of county courthouses in Minnesota
- National Register of Historic Places listings in Winona County, Minnesota
