= Winona Masonic Temple =

- U.S. National Register of Historic Places
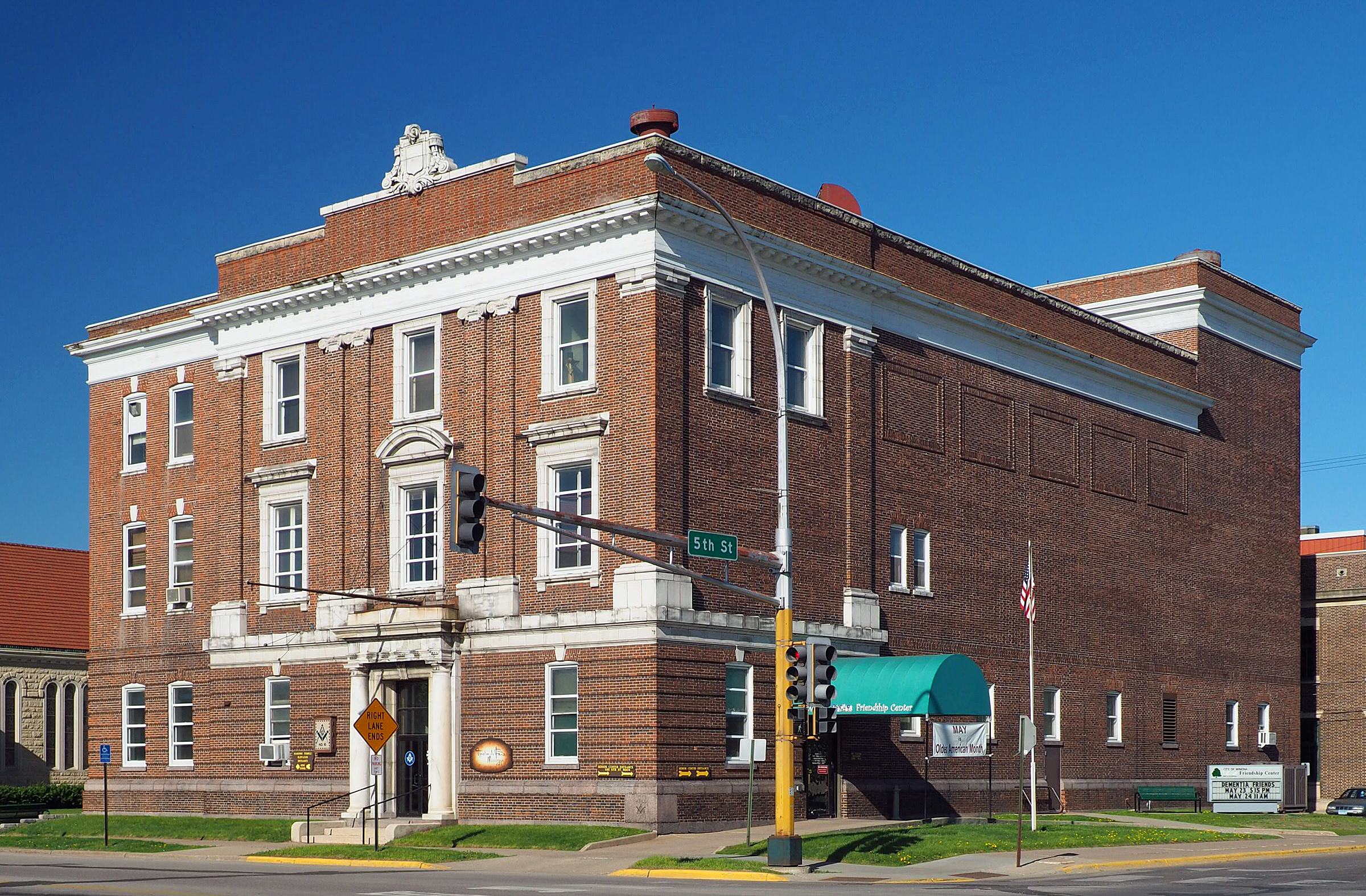
- The Winona Masonic Temple from the northeast

- Location within Minnesota Location within the United States
- Location: 255 Main Street, Winona, Minnesota
- Coordinates: 44°3′2.5″N 91°38′22″W
- Area: Less than one acre
- Built: 1908–09
- Built by: John Lohse
- Architect: Warren Powers Laird and C.F. Osborne
- Architectural style: Beaux-Arts
- NRHP reference No.: 98000152
- Added to NRHP: February 26, 1998

The Winona Masonic Temple is a historic Masonic Temple in Winona, Minnesota, United States, completed in 1909. Many local civic and business leaders were members of the lodge. Containing a large ballroom and other meeting space, the building was an important venue in Winona for both Masonic activities and general public events. The Winona Masonic Temple was listed on the National Register of Historic Places in 1998 for having state-level significance in the themes of art and social history. It was nominated as the headquarters of a fraternal organization important to Winona's civic and social development, and for containing Minnesota's largest collection of Masonic theatre backdrops and stage equipment.

== Masonic history of Winona ==
Many Euro-American men who came to Minnesota in the mid to late nineteenth century were Freemasons. Consequently, the development of Masonry in Minnesota paralleled the organization of many of the state's first towns. In 1853 a Grand Masonic Lodge was organized by the three lodges that already existed in Stillwater, Saint Paul, and St. Anthony. The Grand Lodge dispensed charters for new lodges and created standard procedures and rituals. In January 1857 a charter was issued for Winona Lodge No. 18.

For the first several years of its existence the Winona Lodge met in various buildings. Meetings were mostly held in members' places of business. In 1863 and 1864 local chapters of the Royal Arch and Knights Templar Masons merged with the Winona Lodge. In 1873 the Masons moved to the third floor of the new Laird Norton Lumber Company Building. The space was designed according to the Masons' specifications.

In the late nineteenth century membership grew and the Masonic activities of the Winona Masons became more complex. New Masonic chapters were formed under other Masonic orders. Several bodies were charted that followed the Scottish Rite Valley, one of the most complex orders of Freemasonry. In 1900 a local chapter of the Order of the Eastern Star was formed that allowed female members.

With membership growing the Winona Masonic Benevolent Association (WMBA) was formed in 1906. Part of the WMBA's mission was to construct a new Masonic temple. The WMBA commissioned architects Warren Powers Laird and C.F. Osborne of Philadelphia. Local contractor John Lohse constructed the building. The temple was built in a red brick and stone Beaux-Arts tradition of the Neoclassical style.

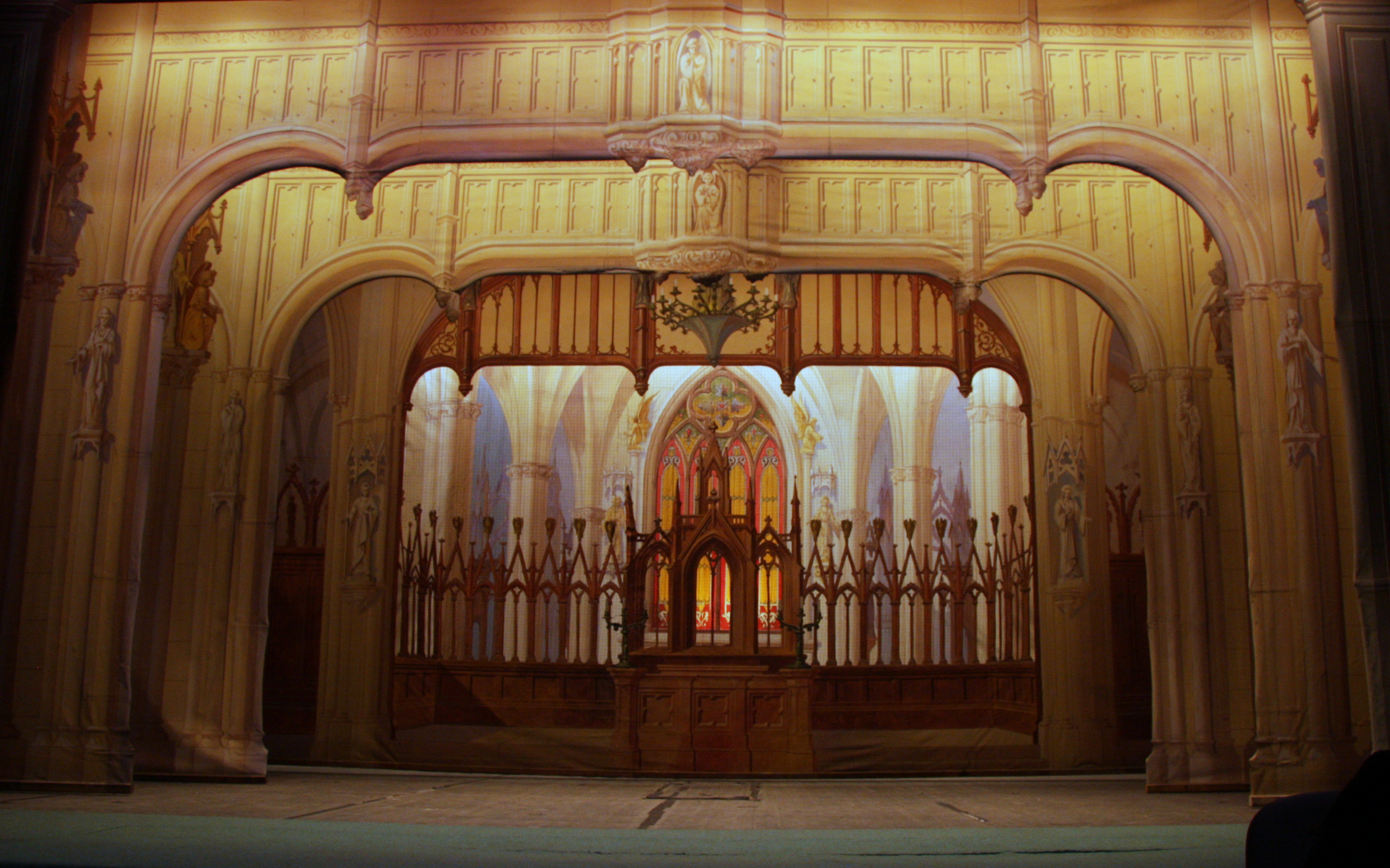
One of the Temple's historic stage backdrops

The most prominent interior feature was a large proscenium-arch stage at the heart of the building. The stage and its scenery were important in the rites and rituals of the various orders of masons, especially the Scottish Rite. The WMBA bought ninety-eight hand-painted scenic drops that were produced by Sosman and Landis Scene Painting Studios in Chicago. The temple was completed in December 1909 with mahogany finishes that reflected Masonic ideology. Masonic furniture and other decorations were also purchased.

The Masons were highly respected in Winona, and the construction of the temple only served to heighten their presence in the community. Masonic events held at the temple consistently brought large numbers of people to Winona. The town's role as a Scottish Rite headquarters also brought regional Masonic conferences to the city for over eighty years. The large ballroom hosted balls, banquets, and civic events.

In the 1930s membership in Masonic organizations began to wane. The Winona Temple, because it was a center for the Scottish Rite, fared better than many others. However, in 1978 the Winona Temple lost what made it prominent when the Scottish Rite was moved to a temple in Rochester, Minnesota. A year later the WMBA sold the Winona Temple to the city. The valuable scenic drops were left in the building even though the Scottish Rite had moved.

== Current use ==
In 1979 the Winona Masonic Benevolent Association sold the building to the city to create a senior center on the ground floor, while retaining access to the upper second and third floors. In 1997 the Theatre du Mississippi was founded and began performances in the Masonic Temple. The city of Winona also rents out the facility as an event venue.

== See also ==
- List of Masonic buildings in the United States
- National Register of Historic Places listings in Winona County, Minnesota
