= Winona Commercial Historic District =

Historic district in Minnesota, United States

- U.S. National Register of Historic Places
- U.S. Historic district
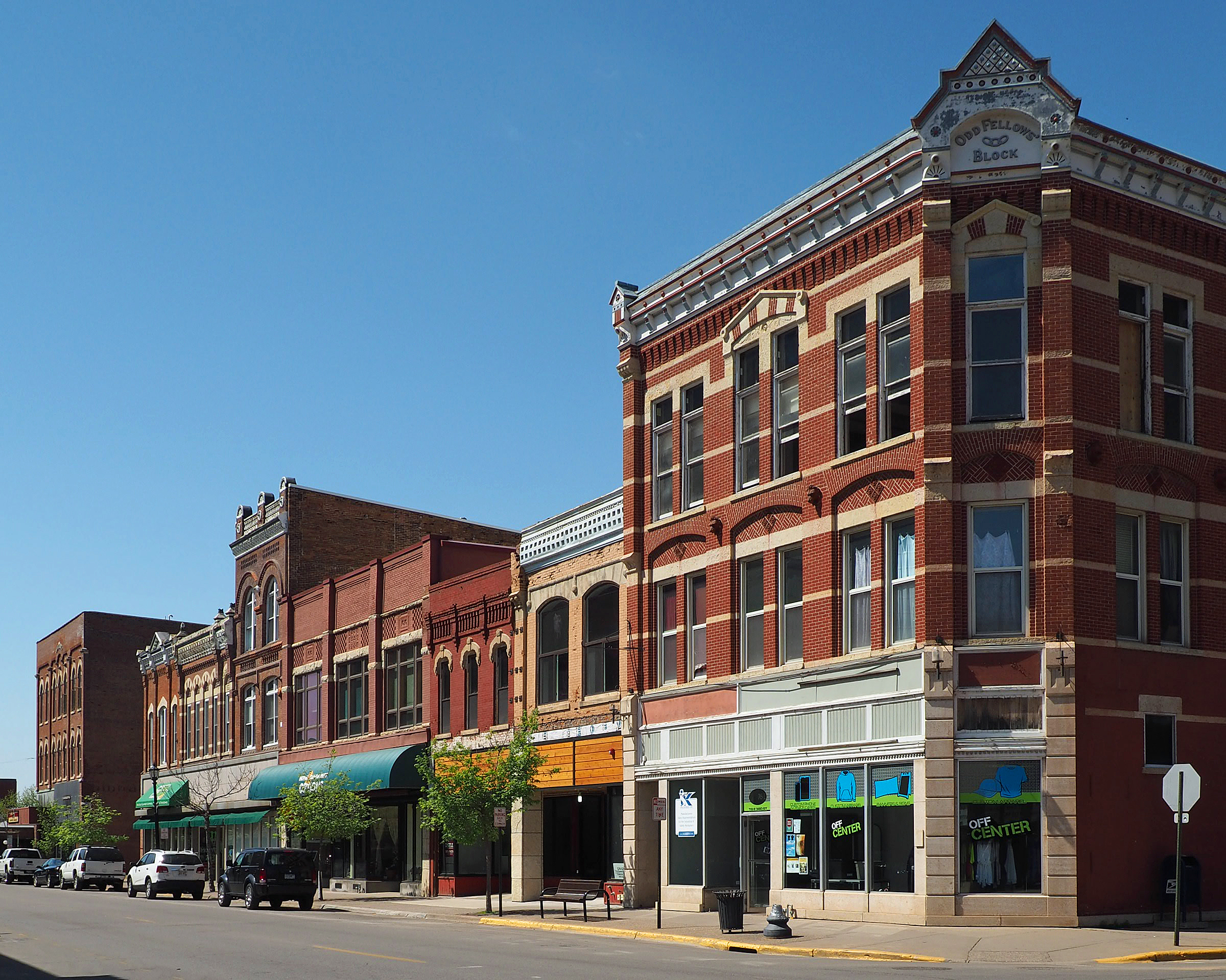
- Part of the Winona Commercial Historic District

- Location within Minnesota Location within the United States
- Location: 3rd Street between Franklin and Johnson Streets, Winona, Minnesota
- Coordinates: 44°3′7″N 91°38′7″W
- Area: 30 acres (12 ha)
- Built: 1868–1920
- Architect: Charles G. Maybury, Purcell, Feick & Elmslie, et al.
- Architectural style: Italianate, Queen Anne, Romanesque Revival
- NRHP reference No.: 98001220 (original); 100005250 (increase)

Significant dates
- Added to NRHP: October 1, 1998
- Boundary increase: June 4, 2020

The Winona Commercial Historic District comprises six downtown blocks along 3rd Street in Winona, Minnesota, United States. It comprises 65 contributing properties mostly built in the 1880s and 1890s. The district was listed on the National Register of Historic Places in 1998 for having local significance in the theme of commerce. It was nominated for reflecting the prosperity of a river and rail town that grew into southeast Minnesota's leading commercial center of the late 19th century.

== See also ==
- National Register of Historic Places listings in Winona County, Minnesota
