= Kaszuba =

Kaszuba may refer to:

- Kaszuba, Podlaskie Voivodeship, settlement in north-eastern Poland
- Kaszuba, Pomeranian Voivodeship, village in north-central Poland
- Kaszuba Leśna, settlement in north-central Poland
- Kaszuba (surname)

== See also ==
- Kaszuby (disambiguation)
