= Zbrzyca (river) =

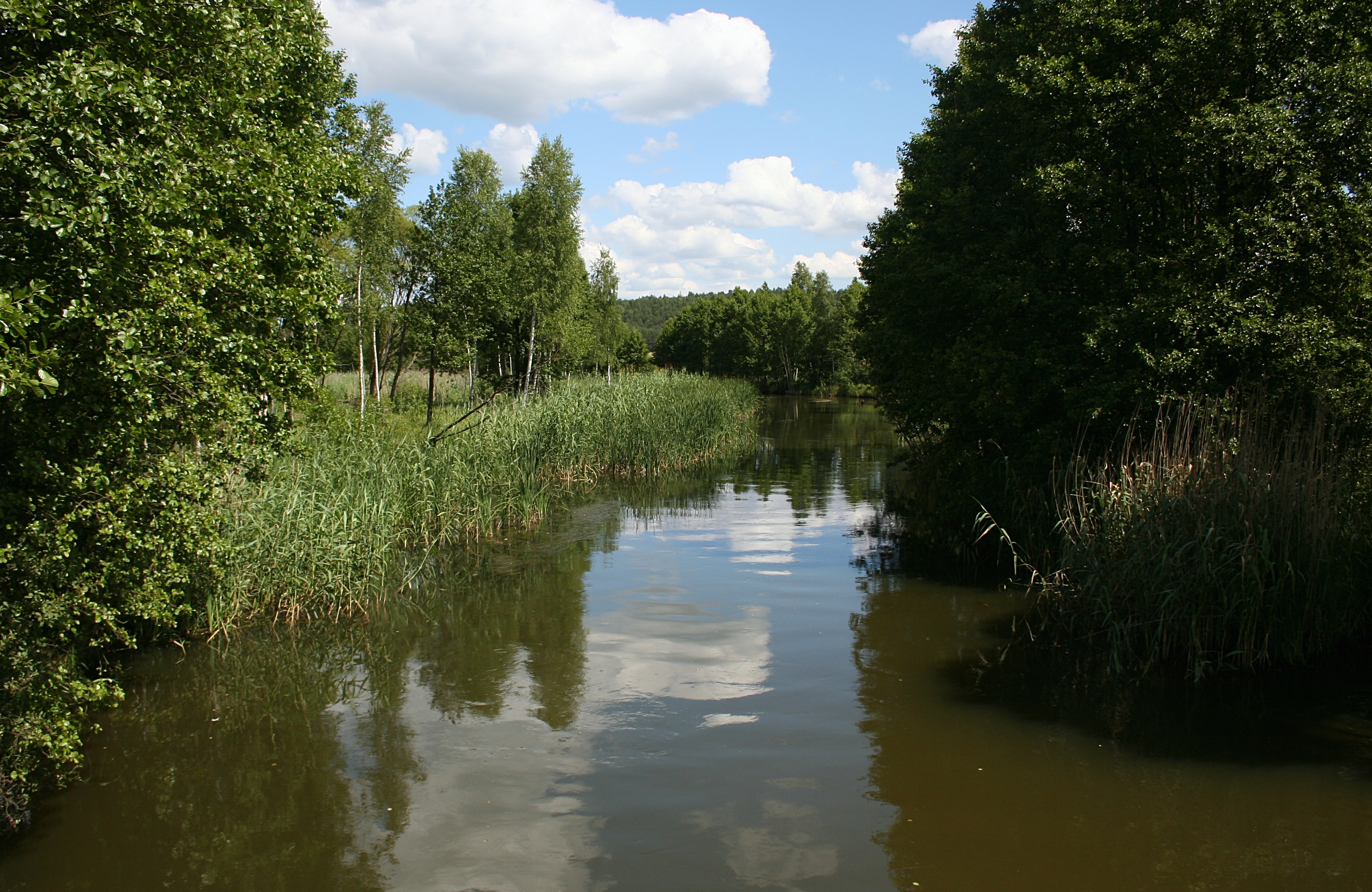
- Zbrzyca by the inlet into Witoczno

Location
- Country: Poland
- Villages: Sominy, Kaszuba, Rolbik, Widno

Physical characteristics
- Source
  - location: Duży Zbełk Lake by Dziemiany
- Mouth
  - location: Brda at Witoczno Lake, Poland
  - coordinates: 53°52′49″N 17°30′49″E
- Length: 48.77 km (30.30 mi)
- Basin size: 448.28 km^{2} (173.08 sq mi)

Basin features
- Progression: Brda→ Vistula→ Baltic Sea
- Tributaries
  - left: Młosina
  - right: Kulawa, Kłonecznica, Boryń

Zbrzyca (Kashubian: Zbrzëca) is a river in Pomeranian Voivodship, Poland.

It the upper flow it passes the lakes Wielkie Sarnowicze, Somińskie, Kruszyńskie, Parzyn. In the middle flow it passes the lakes Milachowo, Laska, Księże, Parszczenica, Śluza.
