= Lendi =

Lendi may refer to either of the following rivers of India:

- Lendi, a tributary of the Manjira River
- Lendi, a tributary of the Purna River

== See also ==
- Lahndi (disambiguation)
- Lendi Vexer, an Argentinian trip hop duo
- Lendy, a village in Poland
