= Laska (disambiguation) =

Laska or Lasca is a draughts (or checkers) variant.

Laska may also refer to:

- Laska (surname)
- Laska Winter (1905–1980), American film actress
- Laska, Chojnice County, Poland
- Laska, Lębork County, Poland
- Laska, West Pomeranian Voivodeship, Poland

== See also ==
- Lasca (disambiguation)
