= Młosina =

Location
- Country: Poland
- Voivodeship: Pomeranian
- County (Powiat): Chojnice
- Gmina: Gmina Brusy

Physical characteristics
- Source: Lake Brzeźno
  - location: east of Orlik
  - coordinates: 53°57′38″N 17°46′10″E
- Mouth: Zbrzyca
  - location: near Kaszuba
  - coordinates: 53°56′49″N 17°39′29″E
- Length: 9 km (5.6 mi)

Basin features
- Progression: Zbrzyca→ Brda→ Vistula→ Baltic Sea

Młosina is a river of Poland. It is a left tributary of the Zbrzyca near Kaszuba, Pomerania.
