= Asmus (disambiguation) =

Asmus may refer to:

== Places ==
- Asmus, Poland, a village in Poland

== People ==
=== Surname ===
- Hermann Asmus (1887–1968), a German art director
- James Asmus, an American writer, actor and comedian
- John F. Asmus (1937–2024), an American research physicist
- Kristina Asmus (born 1988), a Russian theater and film actress
- Lena Asmus (born 1982), a Russian and later German rhythmic gymnast
- Marion Asmus, birth name of Marion Boyars (1927–1999), a British book publisher
- Ronald Asmus (1957–2011), an American diplomat and political analyst
- Valentin Ferdinandovich Asmus (1894–1975), a Russian philosopher
- Walter D. Asmus (born 1941), a German theater director

=== Given name ===
- Asmus Ehrenreich von Bredow (1693–1756), a Prussian Lieutenant General
- Asmus Jacob Carstens (1754–1798), a Danish-German painter
- Asmus Tietchens (born 1947), a German composer of avant-garde music

=== Other ===
Matthias Claudius (1740–1815), a German poet and journalist, known by the penname of Asmus

== See also ==
- Asmus & Clark, an architectural firm based in Nashville, Tennessee
- Asmus v. Pacific Bell, a U.S. labor law case
