= Chernitsa =

Chernitsa, Chernytsia, or Czernica may refer to:

== Bulgaria ==
- Chernitsa, Burgas Province

== Moldova ==
- Cernița, Florești District

== Poland ==
=== Lower Silesian Voivodeship ===
- Gmina Czernica, a gmina in Wrocław County
  - Czernica, Wrocław County, a village in the centre of Gmina Czernica
- Czernica, Jelenia Góra County, a village in Gmina Jeżów Sudecki
- Czernica, Świdnica County, a village in Gmina Dobromierz

=== Silesian Voivodeship ===
- Czernica, Silesian Voivodeship, a village in Gmina Gaszowice, Rybnik County

=== Świętokrzyskie Voivodeship ===
- Czernica, Świętokrzyskie Voivodeship, a village in Gmina Staszów, Staszów County

=== Pomeranian Voivodeship ===
- Czernica, Pomeranian Voivodeship, a village in Gmina Brusy, Chojnice County

== Ukraine ==
- Chernytsia, a village in Zolochiv Raion, Lviv Oblast
