= Lasca (disambiguation) =

Lasca is a draughts (or checkers) variant.

Lasca may also refer to:

- Lasca (film), a 1919 American silent Western
- Lasca, an 1882 poem by Frank Desprez
- Francesco Lasca (born 1988), Italian road bicycle racer
- Lasca, Alabama, an unincorporated community in Marengo County
- Lasca, Texas, a ghost town in Hudspeth County

== See also ==
- Laska (disambiguation)
