= Trzebiatowski =

Trzebiatowski (masculine), Trzebiatowska (feminine) is a Polish language family name. Notable people with the surname include:

- Ewa Żmuda-Trzebiatowska (born 1956), Polish politician
- Jörg "Tritze" Trzebiatowski, a musician of a German band Kreator
- Marta Żmuda Trzebiatowska (born 1984), Polish film, television and theater actress
- Włodzimierz Trzebiatowski (1906–1982), Polish chemist, physicist and mathematician
- Anna Łajming (née Żmuda Trzebiatowska; 1904–2003), Polish writer
