= Młynek =

Młynek may refer to the following places:

- Młynek, Kuyavian-Pomeranian Voivodeship (north-central Poland)
- Młynek, Opoczno County in Łódź Voivodeship (central Poland)
- Młynek, Radomsko County in Łódź Voivodeship (central Poland)
- Młynek, Tomaszów County in Łódź Voivodeship (central Poland)
- Młynek, Pińczów County in Świętokrzyskie Voivodeship (south Poland)
- Młynek, Starachowice County in Świętokrzyskie Voivodeship (south-central Poland)
- Młynek, Koło County in Greater Poland Voivodeship (central Poland)
- Młynek, Konin County in Greater Poland Voivodeship (central Poland)
- Młynek, Silesian Voivodeship (south Poland)
- Młynek, Opole Voivodeship (south Poland)
- Młynek, Chojnice County in Pomeranian Voivodeship (north Poland)
- Młynek, Kartuzy County in Pomeranian Voivodeship (north Poland)

== See also ==
- Młynek (game) (strategy game)
