= Żabno (disambiguation) =

Żabno may refer to the following places:

- Żabno, Kuyavian-Pomeranian Voivodeship (central Poland)
- Żabno in Lesser Poland Voivodeship (south Poland)
- Żabno, Lublin Voivodeship (east Poland)
- Żabno, Subcarpathian Voivodeship (south-east Poland)
- Żabno, Greater Poland Voivodeship (west-central Poland)
- Żabno, Bytów County in Pomeranian Voivodeship (north Poland)
- Żabno, Lubusz Voivodeship (west Poland)
- Żabno, Chojnice County in Pomeranian Voivodeship (north Poland)
- Żabno, Starogard County in Pomeranian Voivodeship (north Poland)
- Żabno, West Pomeranian Voivodeship (north-west Poland)
