= Leśno, Chojnice County =

Village in Pomeranian Voivodeship, Poland

Leśno Lésno
- Village
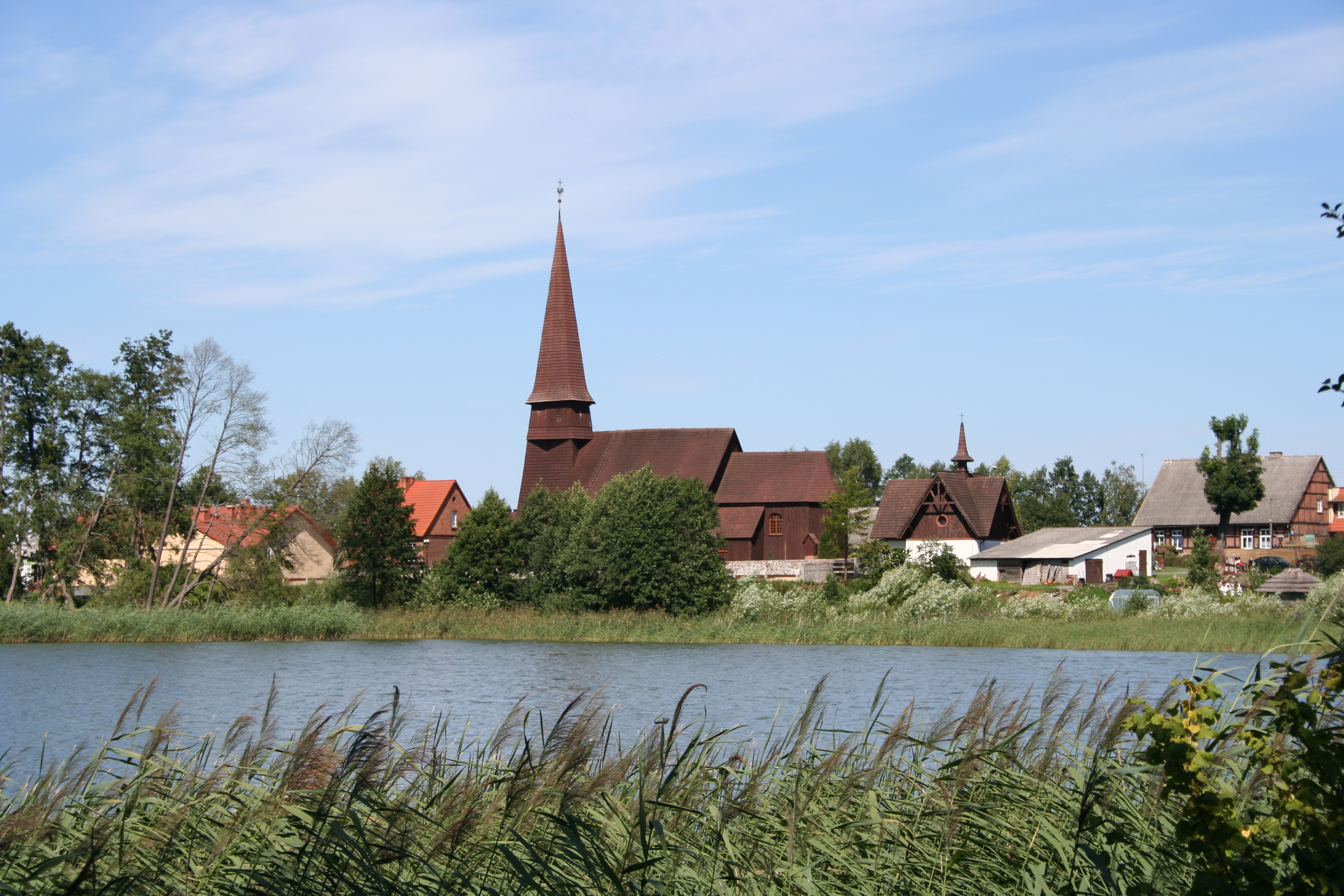
- Panorama of Leśno with the historic church of the Exaltation of the Holy Cross

- Location within Poland
- Coordinates: 53°56′58″N 17°42′0″E
- Country: Poland
- Voivodeship: Pomeranian
- County: Chojnice
- Gmina: Brusy
- Population: 669
- Time zone: UTC+1 (CET)
  - Summer (DST): UTC+2 (CEST)
- Vehicle registration: GCH

Leśno ([ˈlɛɕnɔ] (Kashubian: Lésno; German: Lesno, 1942–45 Leisten)) is a village in the administrative district of Gmina Brusy, within Chojnice County, Pomeranian Voivodeship, in northern Poland. The village is situated on the shores of Leśno Górne and Lesno Dolne lakes.

== History ==
In the near vicinity of Lake Leśno Dolne is an archaeological site called Kamienne Kręgi (transl. Stone Circles) which contains numerous barrows and cists. Some are dated back as far as the Bronze Age. Other, later, barrows are dated back to the 1st and 2nd centuries AD, and are connected with Gothic settlement.

The village of Leśno first appears in the records for the year 1342, in which Winrich von Kniprode, master of the Teutonic Knights, granted it to one "Dytryk" for services to be rendered. Leśno was a royal village of the Polish Crown, administratively located in the Tuchola County in the Pomeranian Voivodeship. In the First Partition of Poland, Leśno, like all of the surrounding region, was annexed by the Kingdom of Prussia. Following World War I, in 1918, Poland regained independence, and from 1919 to 1939 it was included as a part of the Second Polish Republic.

After the German invasion of Poland at the start of World War II in 1939 it was part of Reichsgau Danzig-West Prussia. During the German occupation, the Polish resistance organization Pomeranian Griffin maintained a radio station named Budnik (transl. Alarm Clock) in the nearby hamlet of Widno. On 9 February 1944, 64 Jewish women were executed by Nazi forces in Leśno. They had been brought from a subcamp of the Stutthof concentration camp in Dziemiany and were murdered at an abandoned Polish farm, whose owners had previously been expelled.

== Kashubian emigration to America ==
Leśno has long been considered part of the Kashubian culture. Many families of the Kashubian diaspora, originated from Leśno such as the Bambenek (Bambeneks) and the Stoltmann (Sztoltmans), Spierewka (Sprouffske), and Bielawa who emigrated to the area of Winona, Minnesota in the United States, beginning in the late 1850s.

== Church of the Exaltation of the Holy Cross ==
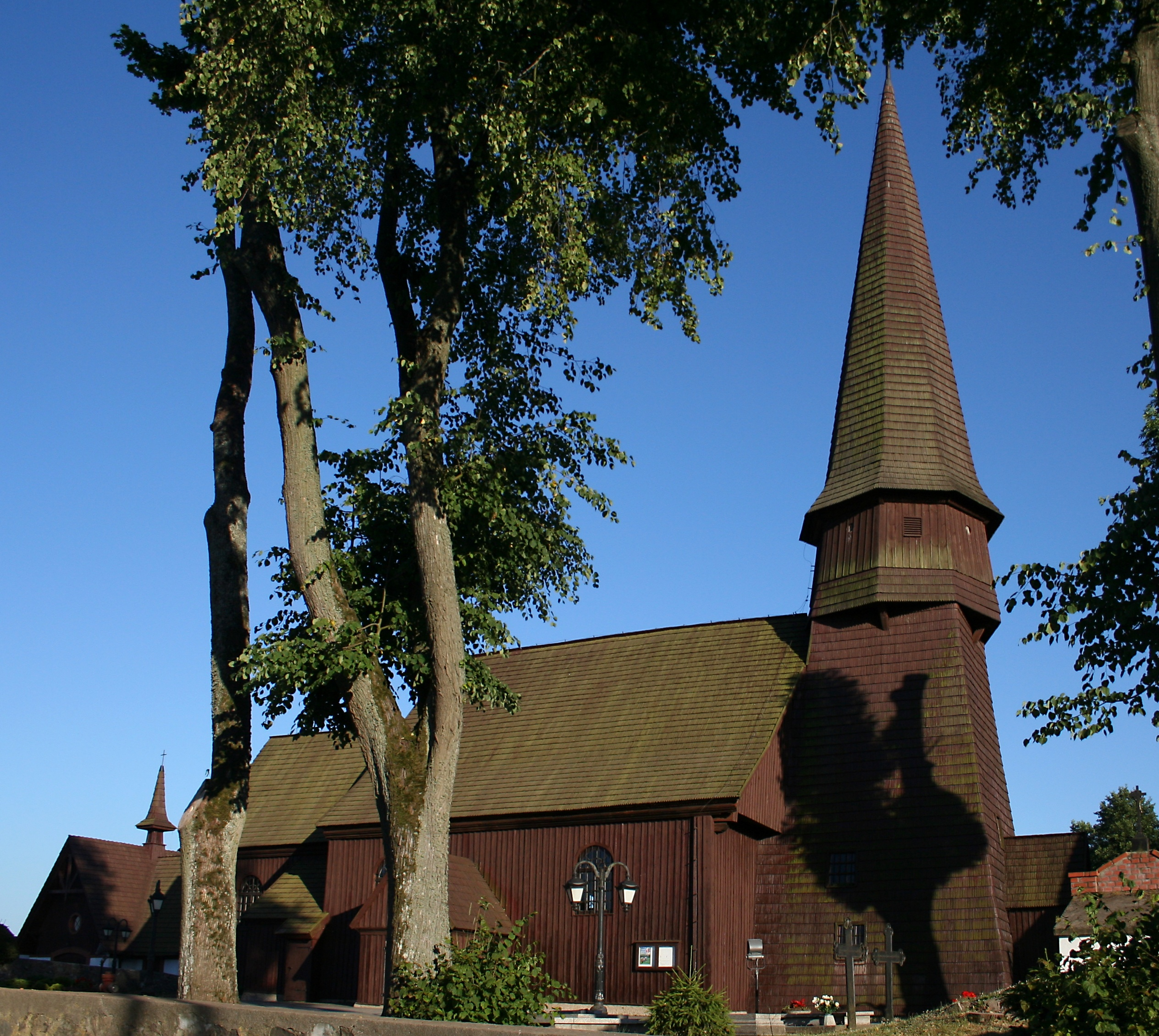
Exaltation of the Holy Cross church

The Church of the Exaltation of the Holy Cross in Leśno dates back as far as 1643 and has the highest wooden tower in Poland. First mentioned in 1534 as the church of Saint Katarzyna, the historical work Ad Historiam Ecclesiasticam Pomeraniae states that it was refounded and given its present name by Queen Marie Louise Gonzaga of Poland circa 1642.

Miraculously, the Church of the Exaltation of the Holy Cross escaped major damage during the First and Second World Wars. Indeed, many of the antique fittings have been preserved and can be viewed today. In keeping with its architectural and cultural significance, the church has received careful restoration and renovations. In 1975 the altars, pulpit, and choral area were renewed. In 1993–1994, the roof and tower coverings were renewed.
