= Pestka =

Pestka may refer to:

- An informal name of the Poznań Fast Tram
- "Pestka" mall in Piątkowo, Poznań
- Pestka (film), a 1995 Polish film
- Pestka (surname)
