= Główczewice =

Village in Pomeranian Voivodeship, Poland

Główczewice Główczëce
- Village
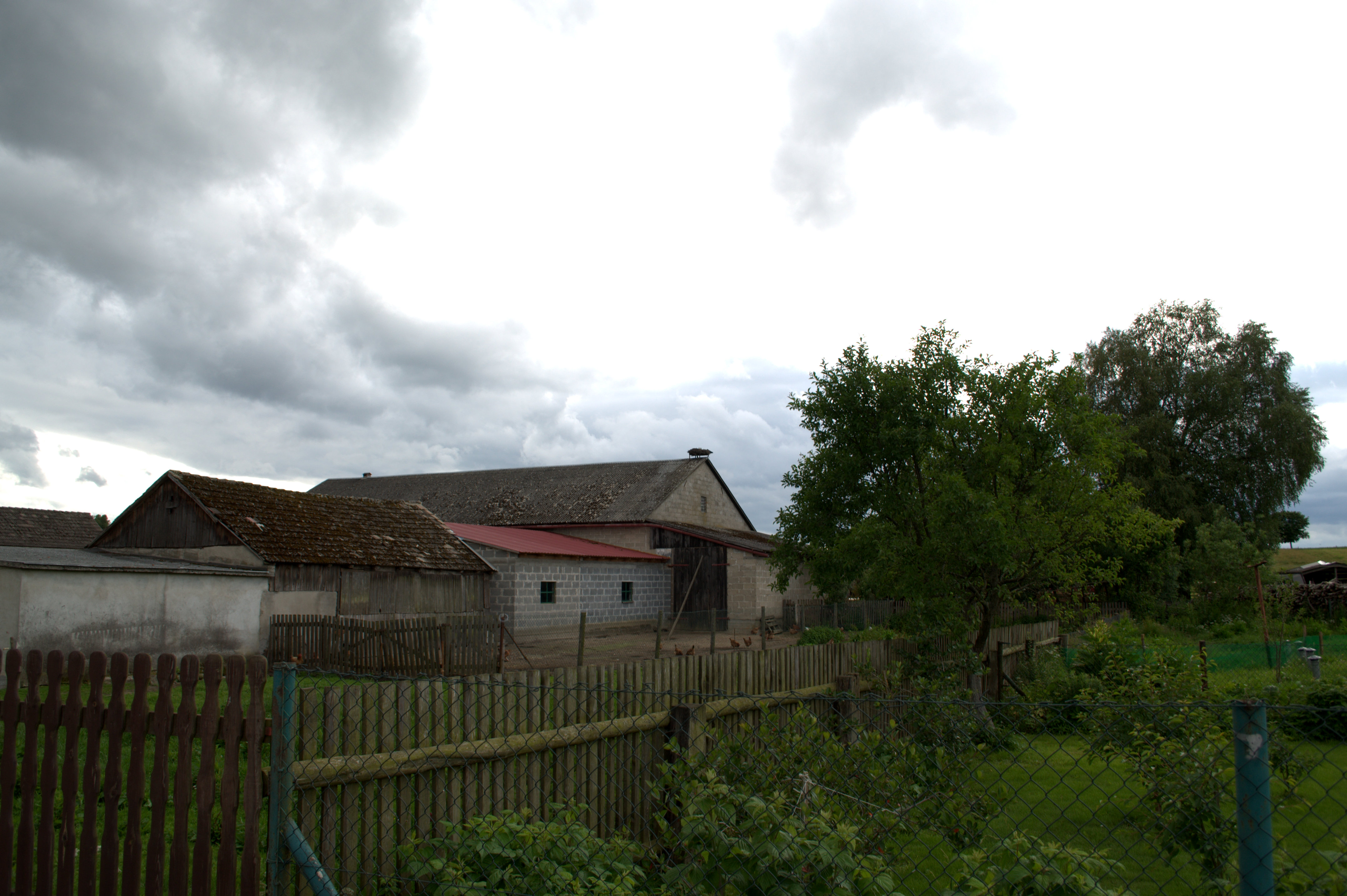

- Location within Poland
- Coordinates: 53°58′35″N 17°43′23″E
- Country: Poland
- Voivodeship: Pomeranian
- County: Chojnice
- Gmina: Brusy

Population
  - Total: 252
- Time zone: UTC+1 (CET)
  - Summer (DST): UTC+2 (CEST)
- Vehicle registration: GCH

Główczewice [ɡwuft͡ʂɛˈvit͡sɛ] (Kashubian: Główczëce) is a village in the administrative district of Gmina Brusy, within Chojnice County, Pomeranian Voivodeship, in northern Poland. It is located in the ethnocultural region of Kashubia in the historic region of Pomerania.
