= Małe Chełmy =

Village in Pomeranian Voivodeship, Poland

Małe Chełmy Môłé Chełmë
- Village
- Location within Poland
- Coordinates: 53°53′43″N 17°37′41″E
- Country: Poland
- Voivodeship: Pomeranian
- County: Chojnice
- Gmina: Brusy

Population
  - Total: 242
- Time zone: UTC+1 (CET)
  - Summer (DST): UTC+2 (CEST)
- Vehicle registration: GCH

Małe Chełmy [ˈmawɛ ˈxɛu̯mɨ] (Kashubian: Môłé Chełmë) is a village in the administrative district of Gmina Brusy, within Chojnice County, Pomeranian Voivodeship, in northern Poland. It is located in the ethnocultural region of Kashubia in the historic region of Pomerania.
