= Kubinowo =

Kubinowo Kubianowo
- Przysiółek
- Location within Poland
- Coordinates: 53°58′13″N 17°32′35″E
- Country: Poland
- Voivodeship: Pomeranian
- County: Chojnice
- Gmina: Brusy

Kubinowo [kubiˈnɔvɔ] (Kashubian: Kubianowo) is a przysiółek in the administrative district of Gmina Brusy, within Chojnice County, Pomeranian Voivodeship, in northern Poland.

For details of the history of the region, see History of Pomerania.
