= Laska (surname) =

Laska is a surname with multiple origins. Variations include:

- Czech/Slovak: Láska (feminine: Lásková)
- Czech/Slovak: Laška (feminine: Lašková)
- Polish: Łaska

== People ==
=== Laska ===
- Pashk Laska (born 1948), Albanian businessman
- Susie Laska (born 1979), Canadian ice hockey player

=== Łaska ===
If adjectival, Łaska serves as the feminine form of Łaski. Otherwise, it may be masculine or feminine.

- Beata Łaska z Kościeleckich (1515–1576), Polish noblewoman
- Katarzyna Łaska (born 1979), Polish singer

=== Láska, Lásková ===
- Dominika Lásková (born 1996), Czech ice hockey player
- Leona Lásková (born 1970), Czech tennis player
- Václav Láska (disambiguation), multiple Czech individuals
