= Wysoka Zaborska =

Wysoka Zaborska Wësokô Zôbòrskô
- Village
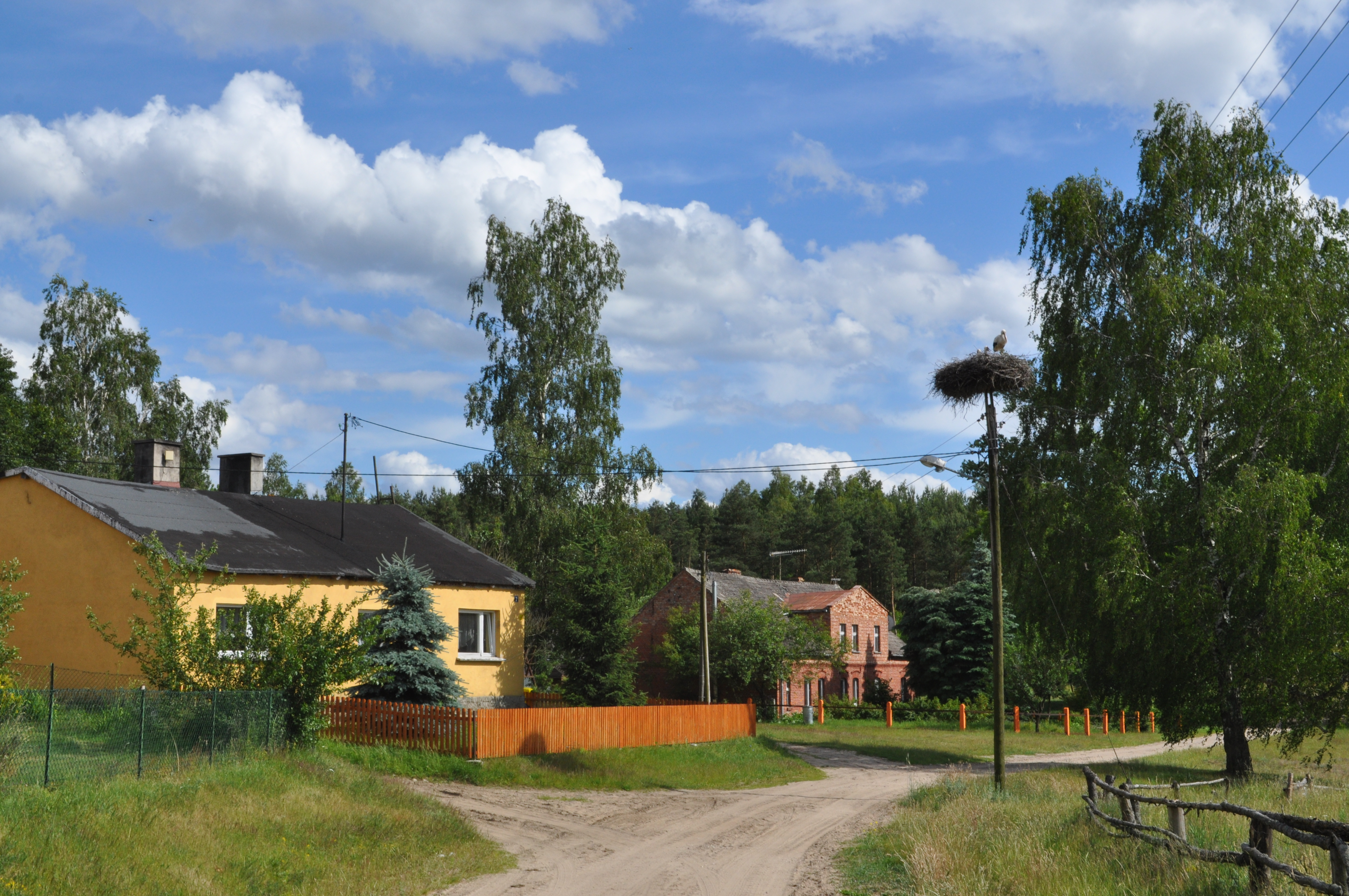

- Location within Poland
- Coordinates: 53°59′16″N 17°41′18″E
- Country: Poland
- Voivodeship: Pomeranian
- County: Chojnice
- Gmina: Brusy
- Population: 42

Wysoka Zaborska [vɨˈsɔka zaˈbɔrska] (Kashubian: Wësokô Zôbòrskô) is a village in the administrative district of Gmina Brusy, within Chojnice County, Pomeranian Voivodeship, in northern Poland.

For details of the history of the region, see History of Pomerania.
