= Zimna Kawa =

- Hamlet
- Location within Poland
- Coordinates: 54°0′N 17°39′E
- Country: Poland
- Voivodeship: Pomeranian
- County: Chojnice
- Gmina: Brusy

Zimna Kawa [ˈʑimna ˈkava] (lit. 'Cold Coffee') is a hamlet in the administrative district of Gmina Brusy, within Chojnice County, Pomeranian Voivodeship, in northern Poland.

For details of the history of the region, see History of Pomerania.
