= Czapiewice Wybudowanie =

Village in Pomeranian Voivodeship, Poland

Czapiewice Wybudowanie Czôpiewice-Pùstczi
- Settlement
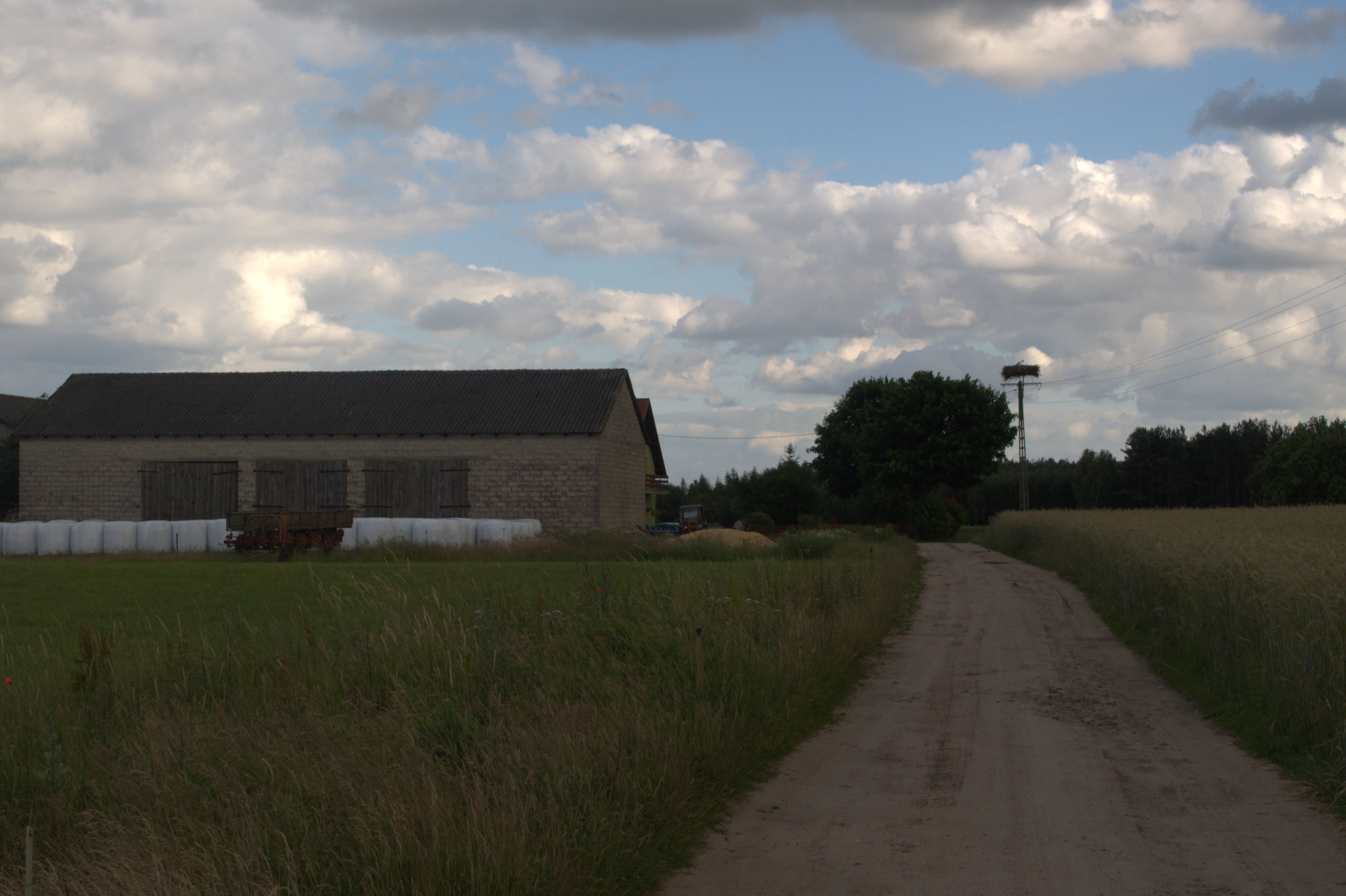
- A white stork's nest in the village

- Location within Poland
- Coordinates: 53°55′08″N 17°41′47″E
- Country: Poland
- Voivodeship: Pomeranian
- County: Chojnice
- Gmina: Brusy

Population
  - Total: 99
- Time zone: UTC+1 (CET)
  - Summer (DST): UTC+2 (CEST)
- Vehicle registration: GCH

Czapiewice Wybudowanie [t͡ʂapjɛˈvit͡sɛ vɨbudɔˈvaɲɛ] (Kashubian: Czôpiewice-Pùstczi) is a settlement in the administrative district of Gmina Brusy, within Chojnice County, Pomeranian Voivodeship, in northern Poland. It is located in the ethnocultural region of Kashubia in the historic region of Pomerania.
