= Kosobudy, Pomeranian Voivodeship =

Village in Pomeranian Voivodeship, Poland

Kosobudy Kòsobùdë
- Village
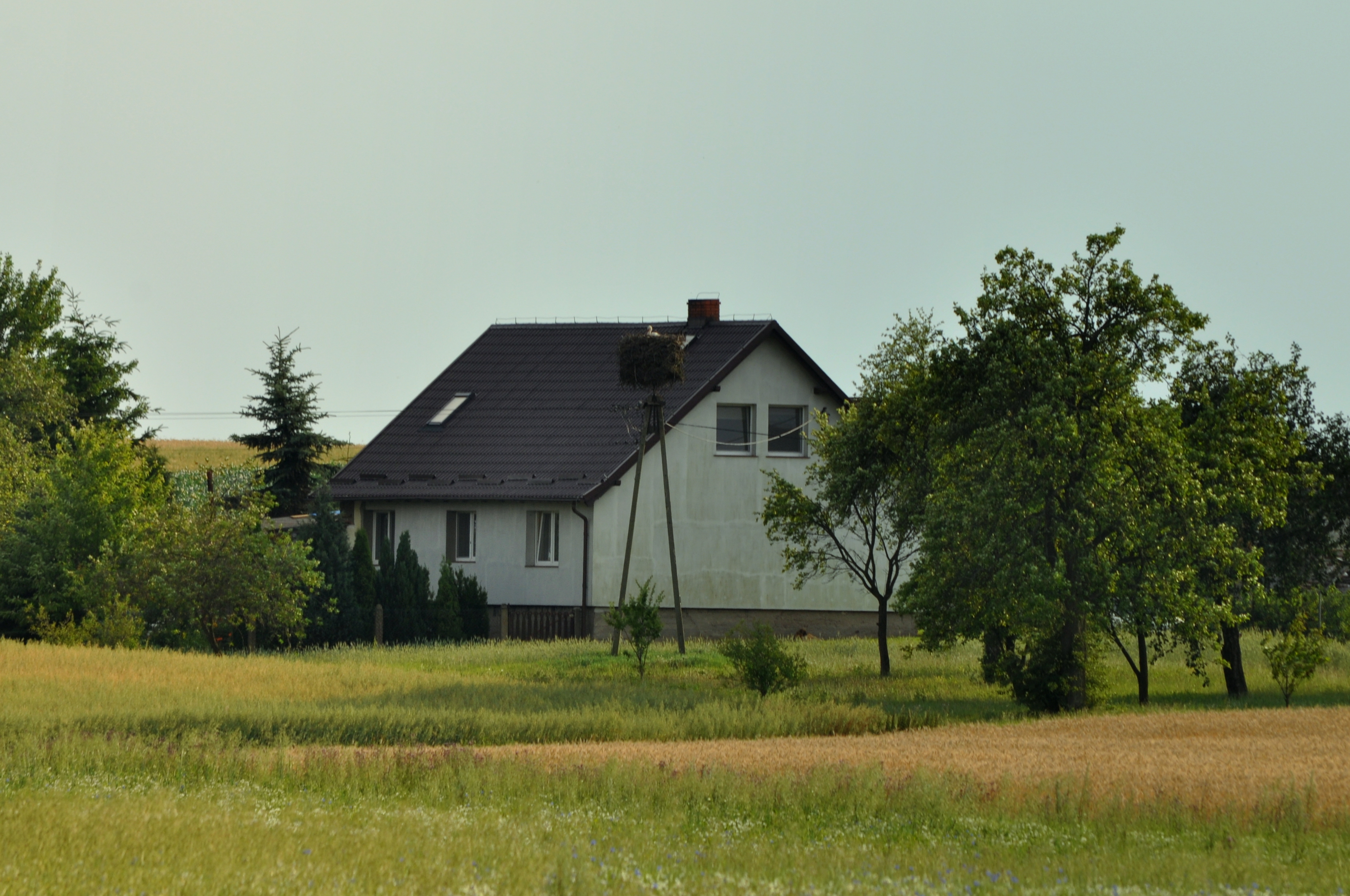

- Location within Poland
- Coordinates: 53°52′30″N 17°45′27″E
- Country: Poland
- Voivodeship: Pomeranian
- County: Chojnice
- Gmina: Brusy

Population
  - Total: 793
- Time zone: UTC+1 (CET)
  - Summer (DST): UTC+2 (CEST)
- Vehicle registration: GCH

Kosobudy [kɔsɔˈbudɨ] (Kashubian: Kòsobùdë) is a village in the administrative district of Gmina Brusy, within Chojnice County, Pomeranian Voivodeship, in northern Poland. It is located in the ethnocultural region of Kashubia within the historic region of Pomerania.

== History ==
Kosobudy was a royal village of the Polish Crown, administratively located in the Tuchola County in the Pomeranian Voivodeship.

Eight Polish citizens were murdered by Nazi Germany in the village during World War II.
