= Czyczkowy Wybudowanie =

Village in Pomeranian Voivodeship, Poland

Czyczkowy Wybudowanie Czëczkòwë-Pùstczi
- Settlement
- Location within Poland
- Coordinates: 53°51′35″N 17°40′08″E
- Country: Poland
- Voivodeship: Pomeranian
- County: Chojnice
- Gmina: Brusy

Population
  - Total: 164
- Time zone: UTC+1 (CET)
  - Summer (DST): UTC+2 (CEST)
- Vehicle registration: GCH

Czyczkowy Wybudowanie [t͡ʂɨt͡ʂˈkɔvɨ vɨbudɔˈvaɲɛ] (Kashubian: Czëczkòwë-Pùstczi) is a settlement in the administrative district of Gmina Brusy, within Chojnice County, Pomeranian Voivodeship, in northern Poland. It is located in the ethnocultural region of Kashubia in the historic region of Pomerania.
