= Męcikał-Struga =

Village in Pomeranian Voivodeship, Poland

Męcikał-Struga Mãcëkôł-Strëga
- Settlement
- Location within Poland
- Coordinates: 53°49′44″N 17°40′40″E
- Country: Poland
- Voivodeship: Pomeranian
- County: Chojnice
- Gmina: Brusy

Population
  - Total: 58
- Time zone: UTC+1 (CET)
  - Summer (DST): UTC+2 (CEST)
- Vehicle registration: GCH

Męcikał-Struga [mɛnˈt͡ɕikau̯ ˈstruɡa] (Kashubian: Mãcëkôł-Strëga) is a settlement in the administrative district of Gmina Brusy, within Chojnice County, Pomeranian Voivodeship, in northern Poland. It is located in the ethnocultural region of Kashubia in the historic region of Pomerania.
