= Wielkie Chełmy =

Wielkie Chełmy Dużé Chełmë
- Village
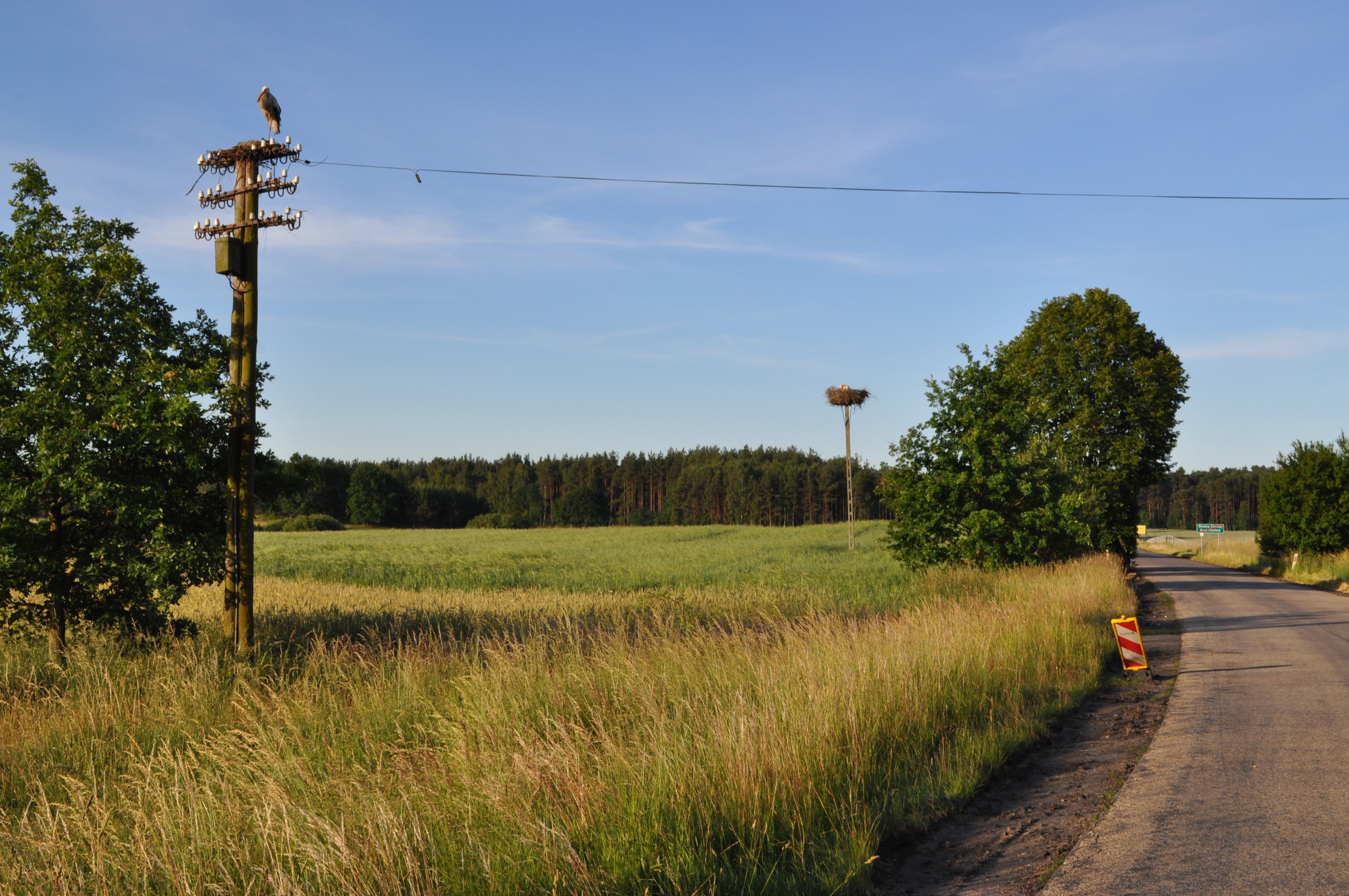

- Location within Poland
- Coordinates: 53°52′52″N 17°38′17″E
- Country: Poland
- Voivodeship: Pomeranian
- County: Chojnice
- Gmina: Brusy
- Population: 294

Wielkie Chełmy [ˈvjɛlkʲɛ ˈxɛu̯mɨ] (Kashubian: Dużé Chełmë) is a village in the administrative district of Gmina Brusy, within Chojnice County, Pomeranian Voivodeship, in northern Poland.

For details of the history of the region, see History of Pomerania.
