= Kaszuba (surname) =

Kaszuba (Polish pronunciation: [kaˈʂuba]) is a Polish-language surname, meaning "Kashubian". It may be transliterated as Kashuba (Russian and Ukrainian), Kašuba (Lithuanian), Kachouba (French-style), or Kaschuba (German).

People with this surname include:

- Aleksandra Kasuba (1923–2019), Lithuanian-American environmental artist
- Angela Kashuba, American pharmacologist
- Jakub Kaszuba (fighter) (born 1995), Polish mixed martial artist
- Jakub Kaszuba (footballer) (born 1988), Polish footballer
- Kazimierz Kaszuba (1930–1990), Polish footballer
- Oleksandra Kashuba (born 1996), Ukrainian synchronized swimmer
- Pavel Kashuba (1913–1944), Soviet military pilot
- Romualdas Kasuba (1931–2019), Lithuanian-American engineer
- Valentina Kachouba (1898–1997), Russian dancer
- Valery Kashuba (born 1984), Kyrgyzstani footballer
- Vladimir Kashuba (1900–1963), Soviet general
- Vytautas Kašuba, Lithuanian sculptor
