= Anna Łajming =

Kashubian writer

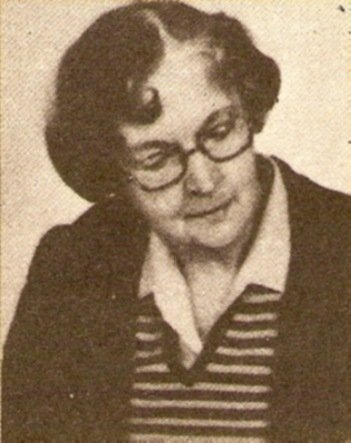
- Born: Anna Żmuda Trzebiatowska; July 24, 1904; Zwangshof, German Empire
- Died: July 13, 2003 (aged 98); Słupsk, Poland
- Spouse: Nikolai Łajming
- Children: 2
- Writing career
- Language: Kashubian
- Years active: 1958–2003
- Genre: Historical fiction
- Subject: Kashubia
- Notable work: The Four Leafed Clover
- Notable awards: Order of Poland Restored (Polonia Restituta) (Cavalier) Golden "Cross of Merit" (Poland)
- Website: annalajming.pl

Anna Łajming (née Żmuda Trzebiatowska 24 July 1904 in the Kashubian village of Zwangshof – 13 July 2003 in Słupsk, Pomeranian Voivodeship, Poland), one of thirteen children born to Jan and Marianna Żmuda Trzebiatowski.

== Life and work ==
Although Łajming was a prolific writer of Kashubian and Polish short stories, novels, memoirs, and plays, she did not publish her first work until 1958. As a young woman, she did clerical work in various locations including the Kociewian city of Tczew, where, in 1929, she met and married a Tsarist Russian refugee named Nikolai Łajming. They became the parents of a daughter Wera and a son, the artist Włodzimierz Łajming. In 1953 she and her family moved to Słupsk, where her husband's White Russian background would attract less unfavorable notice.

In 2011, Blanche Krbechek and Stanisław Frymark published The Four Leafed Clover, an English translation of her 1985 short story collection Czterolistna Koniczyna.

== Honours ==
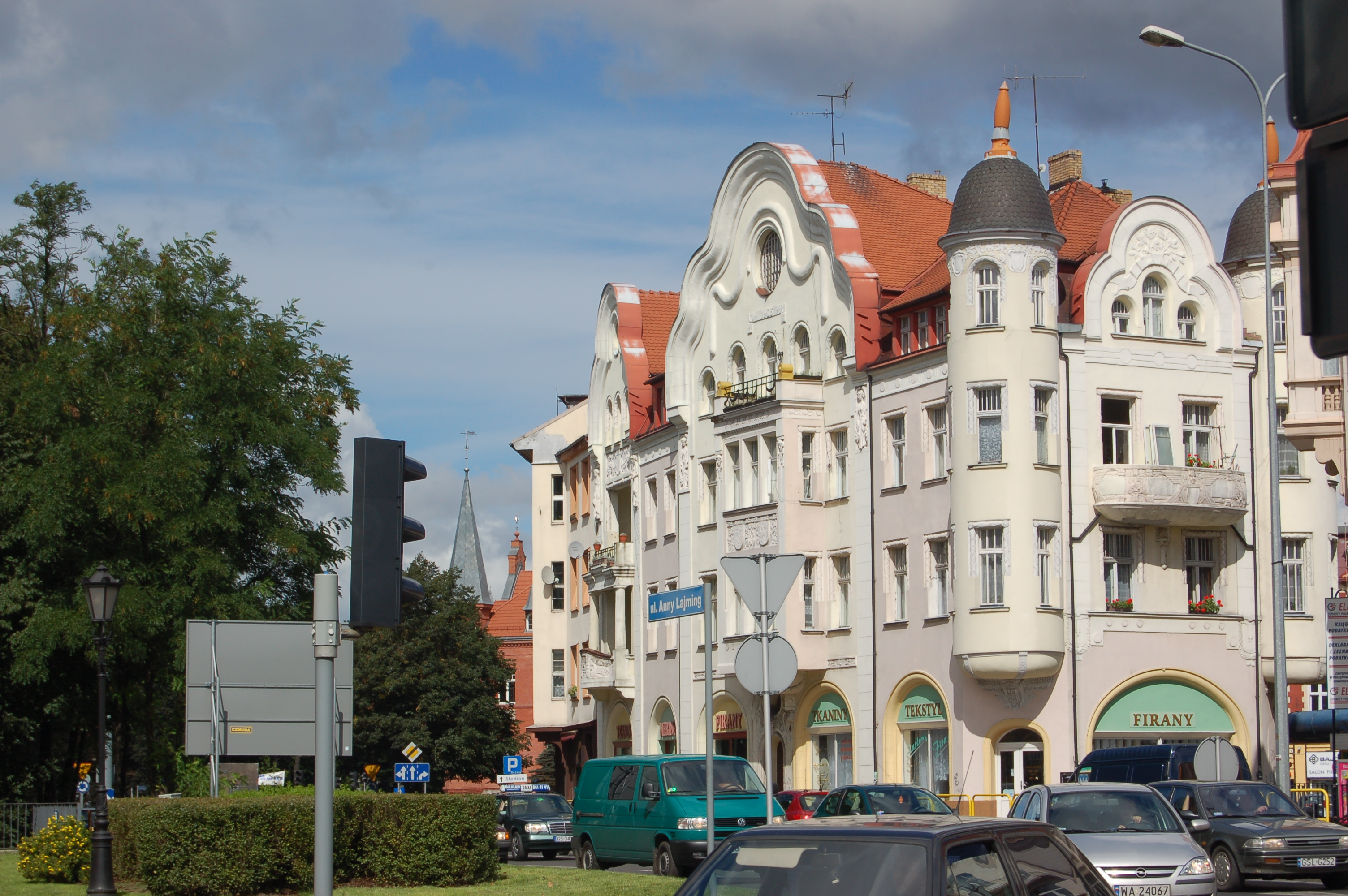
Anna Lajming Street in Słupsk, Poland

In 1974, Anna Łajming was awarded the "Stolem" medal by the Kashubian-Pomeranian Association for her contributions to Kashubian culture. On 29 March 2000 she was named an honorary citizen of the city of Słupsk. In 2005, the city of Słupsk also named Anna Łajming Street (ulica ul. Anny Łajming) in her honor.

== Bibliography ==
- Łajming, Anna (2011). The Four Leafed Clover. Translated by Krbechek, Blanche; Frymark, Stanisław. Gdańsk: Instytut Kaszubski w Gdańsku. ISBN 978-83-89079-88-6.
