= Skoszewo, Pomeranian Voivodeship =

Village in Poland

Skoszewo Skòszewò
- Village
- Location within Poland
- Coordinates: 54°1′38″N 17°37′17″E
- Country: Poland
- Voivodeship: Pomeranian
- County: Chojnice
- Gmina: Brusy
- Population: 64

Skoszewo [skɔˈʂɛvɔ] (Kashubian: Skòszewò) is a village in the administrative district of Gmina Brusy, within Chojnice County, Pomeranian Voivodeship, in northern Poland.

For details of the history of the region, see History of Pomerania.
