= Antoniewo, Pomeranian Voivodeship =

Settlement in Pomeranian Voivodeship, Poland

Antoniewo Antóniewò
- Settlement
- Location within Poland
- Coordinates: 53°53′36″N 17°37′10″E
- Country: Poland
- Voivodeship: Pomeranian
- County: Chojnice
- Gmina: Brusy

Population
  - Total: 63
- Time zone: UTC+1 (CET)
  - Summer (DST): UTC+2 (CEST)
- Vehicle registration: GCH

Antoniewo [antɔˈɲɛvɔ] (Kashubian: Antóniewò) is a settlement in the administrative district of Gmina Brusy, within Chojnice County, Pomeranian Voivodeship, in northern Poland. It is located in the ethnocultural region of Kashubia in the historic region of Pomerania.
