= Pokrzywno, Pomeranian Voivodeship =

Village in Poland

Pokrzywno Pòkrziwno
- Settlement
- Location within Poland
- Coordinates: 53°48′57″N 17°41′18″E
- Country: Poland
- Voivodeship: Pomeranian
- County: Chojnice
- Gmina: Brusy
- Population: 13

Pokrzywno [pɔˈkʂɨvnɔ] (Kashubian: Pòkrziwno) is a settlement in the administrative district of Gmina Brusy, within Chojnice County, Pomeranian Voivodeship, in northern Poland.

For details of the history of the region, see History of Pomerania.
