= Pestka (surname) =

Pestka is a Polish-language surname meaning literally "kernel". Notable people with the surname include:

- Kamil Pestka (born 1998), Polish footballer
- Maciej Pestka (born 1979), Polish Equestrian - Jumper
- Sidney Pestka (1936–2016), American biochemist and geneticist
- Stanisław Pestka (1929–2015), Kashubian poet
- Steve Pestka (born 1951), American politician, attorney, and businessman
