= Parowa, Pomeranian Voivodeship =

Village in Poland

Parowa Pôrowa
- Hamlet
- Location within Poland
- Coordinates: 53°47′50″N 17°40′11″E
- Country: Poland
- Voivodeship: Pomeranian
- County: Chojnice
- Gmina: Brusy
- Population: 9

Parowa [paˈrɔva] (Kashubian: Pôrowa) is a hamlet in the administrative district of Gmina Brusy, within Chojnice County, Pomeranian Voivodeship, in northern Poland.
