= Huta, Chojnice County =

Village in Pomeranian Voivodeship, Poland

Huta Hëta
- Village
- Location within Poland
- Coordinates: 53°51′16″N 17°49′45″E
- Country: Poland
- Voivodeship: Pomeranian
- County: Chojnice
- Gmina: Brusy

Population
  - Total: 81
- Time zone: UTC+1 (CET)
  - Summer (DST): UTC+2 (CEST)
- Vehicle registration: GCH

Huta [ˈxuta] (Kashubian: Hëta) is a village in the administrative district of Gmina Brusy, within Chojnice County, Pomeranian Voivodeship, in northern Poland. It is located in the ethnocultural region of Kashubia within the historic region of Pomerania.
