= Gacnik =

- Village
- Location within Poland
- Coordinates: 53°54′11″N 17°44′43″E
- Country: Poland
- Voivodeship: Pomeranian
- County: Chojnice
- Gmina: Brusy
- Population: 142

Gacnik (Polish pronunciation: [ˈɡat͡sɲik]) is a village in the administrative district of Gmina Brusy, within Chojnice County, Pomeranian Voivodeship, in northern Poland.

For details of the history of the region, see History of Pomerania.
