= Windorp =

- Village
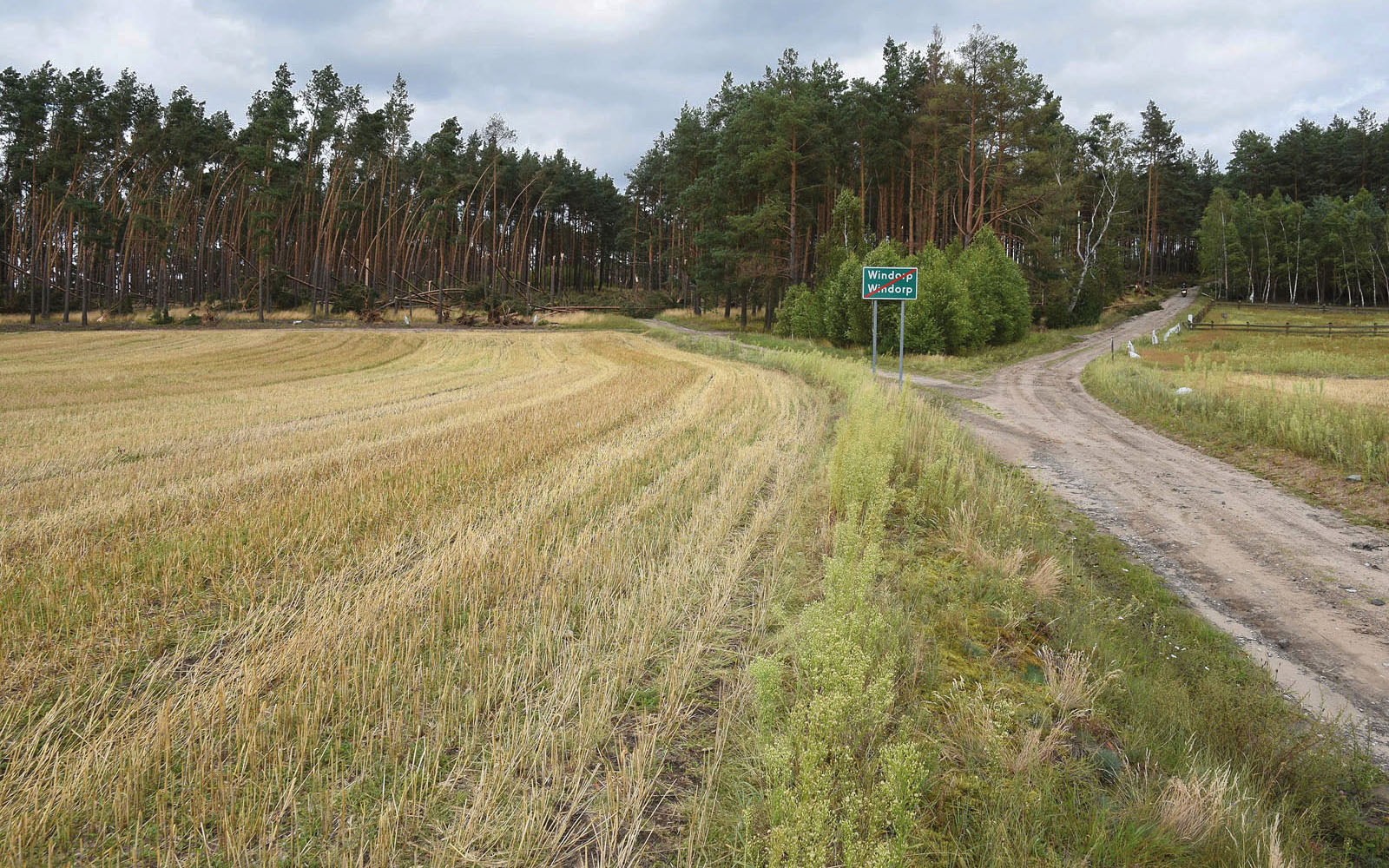

- Location within Poland
- Coordinates: 53°59′26″N 17°38′24″E
- Country: Poland
- Voivodeship: Pomeranian
- County: Chojnice
- Gmina: Brusy
- Elevation: 143.5 m (471 ft)
- Population: 14

Windorp [ˈvindɔrp] is a village in the administrative district of Gmina Brusy, within Chojnice County, Pomeranian Voivodeship, in northern Poland.

For details of the history of the region, see History of Pomerania.
