= Czyczkowy =

Village in Pomeranian Voivodeship, Poland

Czyczkowy Czëczkòwë
- Village
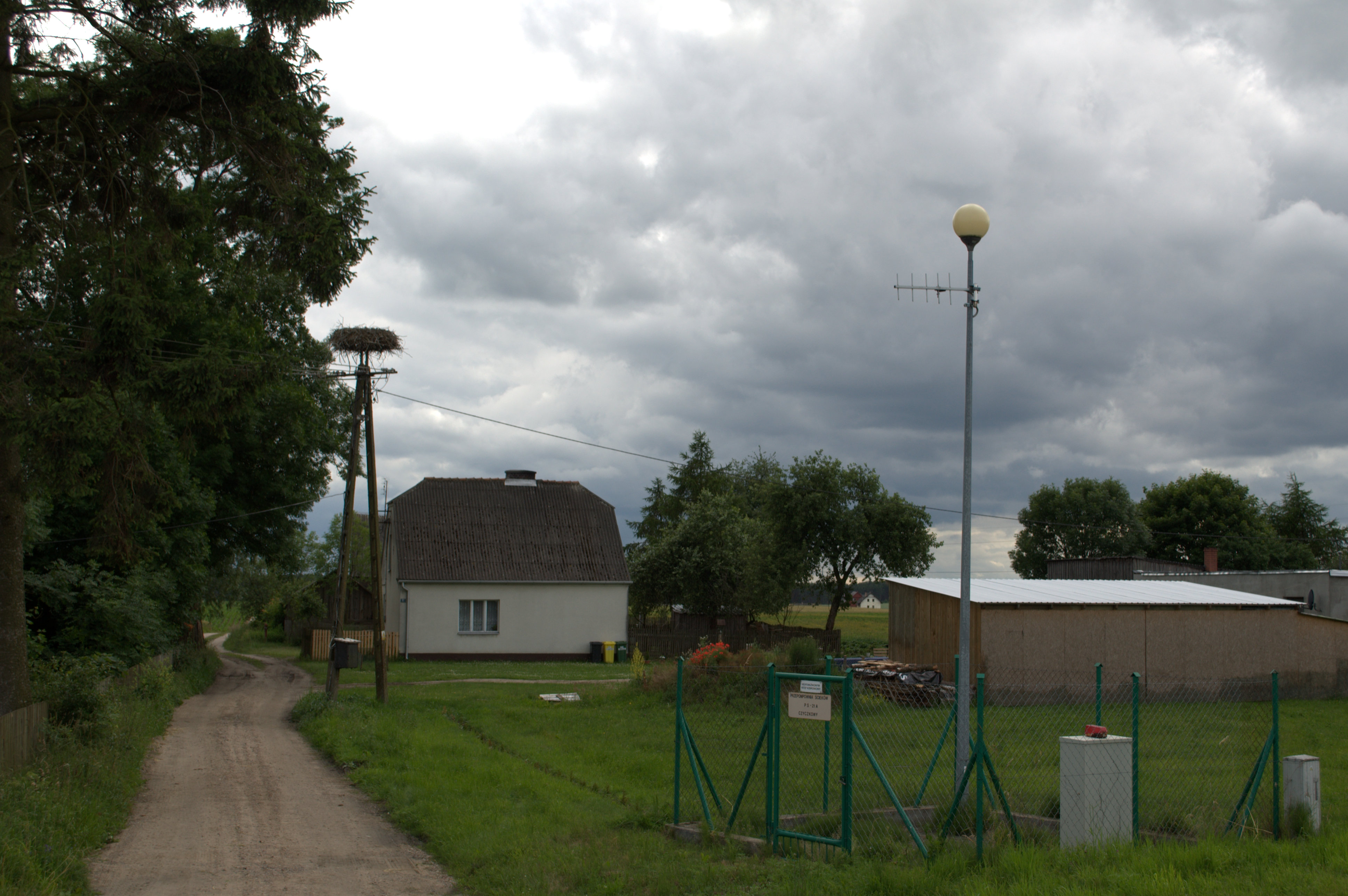

- Location within Poland
- Coordinates: 53°52′16″N 17°40′32″E
- Country: Poland
- Voivodeship: Pomeranian
- County: Chojnice
- Gmina: Brusy

Population
  - Total: 648
- Time zone: UTC+1 (CET)
  - Summer (DST): UTC+2 (CEST)
- Vehicle registration: GCH

Czyczkowy [t͡ʂɨt͡ʂˈkɔvɨ] (Kashubian: Czëczkòwë) is a village in the administrative district of Gmina Brusy, within Chojnice County, Pomeranian Voivodeship, in northern Poland. It is located in the ethnocultural region of Kashubia in the historic region of Pomerania.

== History ==
Czyczkowy was a royal village of the Polish Crown, administratively located in the Tuchola County in the Pomeranian Voivodeship.

== Notable people ==
Czyczkowy is the birthplace of Józef Jankowski, Pallotine, priest, member of Polish resistance during the German occupation of Poland (World War II), beaten to death by a kapo in the Auschwitz concentration camp on 16 October 1941. He is considered one of the 108 Blessed Polish Martyrs of World War II by the Catholic Church.
