= Okręglik =

Settlement in Poland

Okręglik Òkrãglëk
- Colony
- Location within Poland
- Coordinates: 53°47′39″N 17°43′29″E
- Country: Poland
- Voivodeship: Pomeranian
- County: Chojnice
- Gmina: Brusy
- Population: 28

Okręglik [ɔˈkrɛnɡlik] (Kashubian: Òkrãglëk) is a colony in the administrative district of Gmina Brusy, within Chojnice County, Pomeranian Voivodeship, in northern Poland.

For details of the history of the region, see History of Pomerania.
