= Spierwia =

Village in Poland

Spierwia Spiérwiô
- Village
- Location within Poland
- Coordinates: 53°49′38″N 17°40′18″E
- Country: Poland
- Voivodeship: Pomeranian
- County: Chojnice
- Gmina: Brusy
- Population: 4

Spierwia [ˈspjɛrvja] (Kashubian: Spiérwiô) is a village in the administrative district of Gmina Brusy, within Chojnice County, Pomeranian Voivodeship, in northern Poland.

For details of the history of the region, see History of Pomerania.
