= Turowiec, Pomeranian Voivodeship =

Settlement in Poland

Turowiec Turówc
- Settlement
- Location within Poland
- Coordinates: 53°48′13″N 17°39′46″E
- Country: Poland
- Voivodeship: Pomeranian
- County: Chojnice
- Gmina: Brusy
- Population: 3

Turowiec [tuˈrɔvjɛt͡s] (Kashubian: Turówc) is a settlement in the administrative district of Gmina Brusy, within Chojnice County, Pomeranian Voivodeship, in northern Poland.

For details of the history of the region, see History of Pomerania.
