= Zalesie, Chojnice County =

Zalesie Zôles
- Village
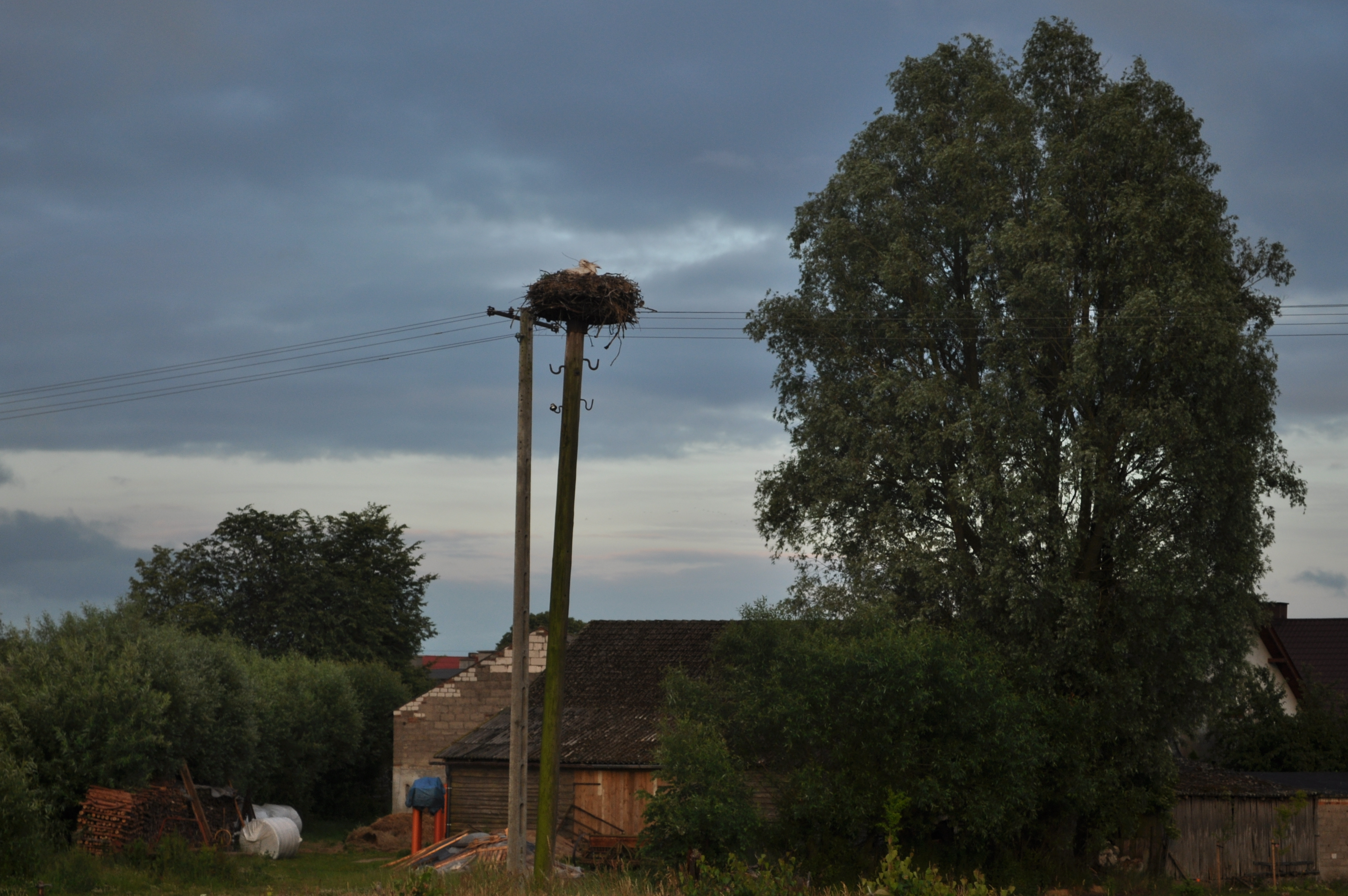
- A white stork's nest in the village

- Location within Poland
- Coordinates: 53°55′16″N 17°43′33″E
- Country: Poland
- Voivodeship: Pomeranian
- County: Chojnice
- Gmina: Brusy
- Population: 584
- Time zone: UTC+1 (CET)
  - Summer (DST): UTC+2 (CEST)
- Vehicle registration: GCH

Zalesie [zaˈlɛɕɛ] (Kashubian: Zôles) is a village in the administrative district of Gmina Brusy, within Chojnice County, Pomeranian Voivodeship, in northern Poland.
