= Chłopowy =

Settlement in Pomeranian Voivodeship, Poland

Chłopowy Chłopòwò
- Hamlet
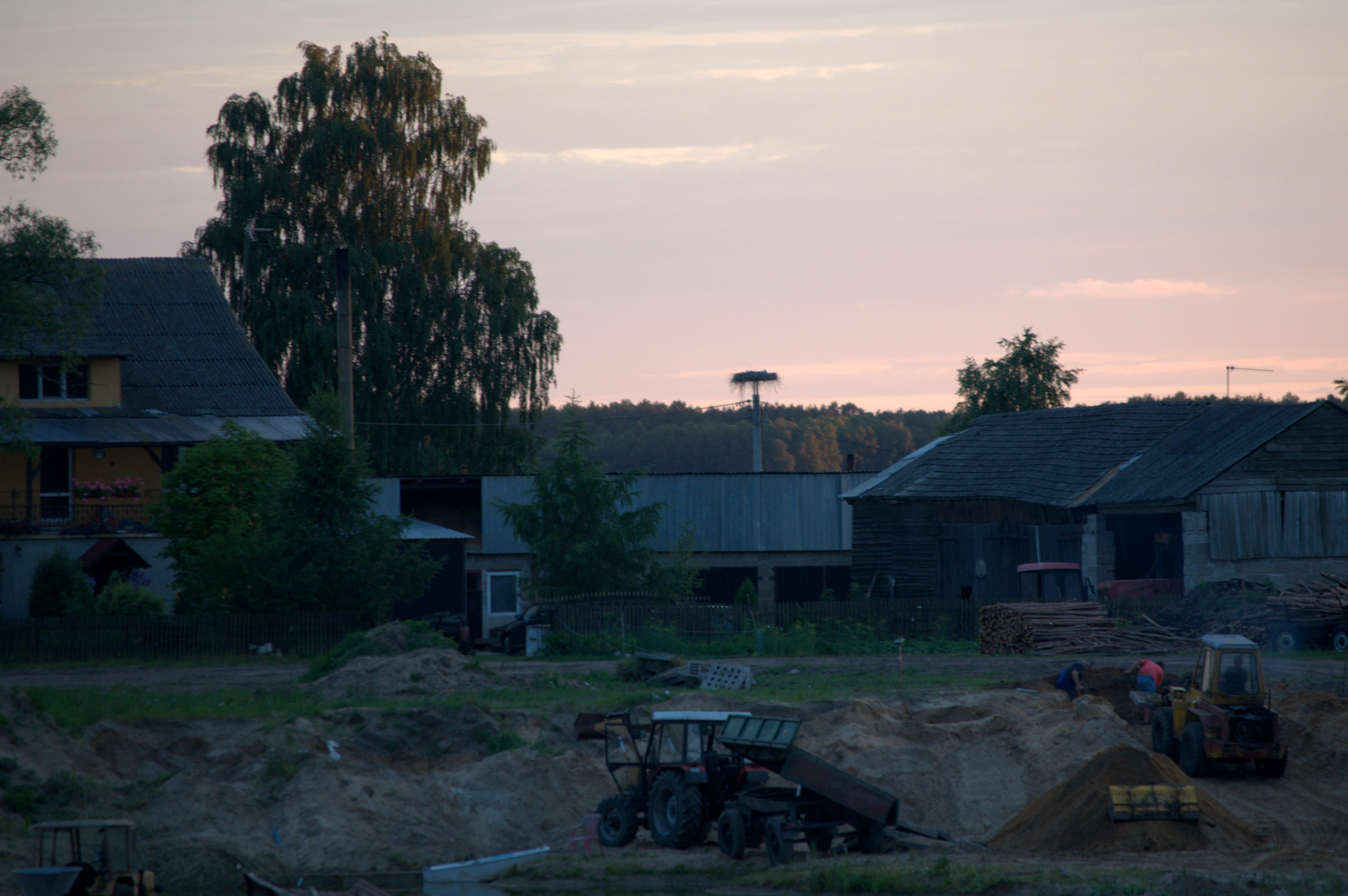

- Location within Poland
- Coordinates: 53°50′34″N 17°48′42″E
- Country: Poland
- Voivodeship: Pomeranian
- County: Chojnice
- Gmina: Brusy

Population
  - Total: 45
- Time zone: UTC+1 (CET)
  - Summer (DST): UTC+2 (CEST)
- Vehicle registration: GCH

Chłopowy [xwɔˈpɔvɨ] (Kashubian: Chłopòwò) is a hamlet in the administrative district of Gmina Brusy, within Chojnice County, Pomeranian Voivodeship, in northern Poland. It is located in the ethnocultural region of Kashubia in the historic region of Pomerania.
