= Brusy Wybudowanie =

Village in Pomeranian Voivodeship, Poland

Brusy Wybudowanie Brusë-Pùstczi
- Village
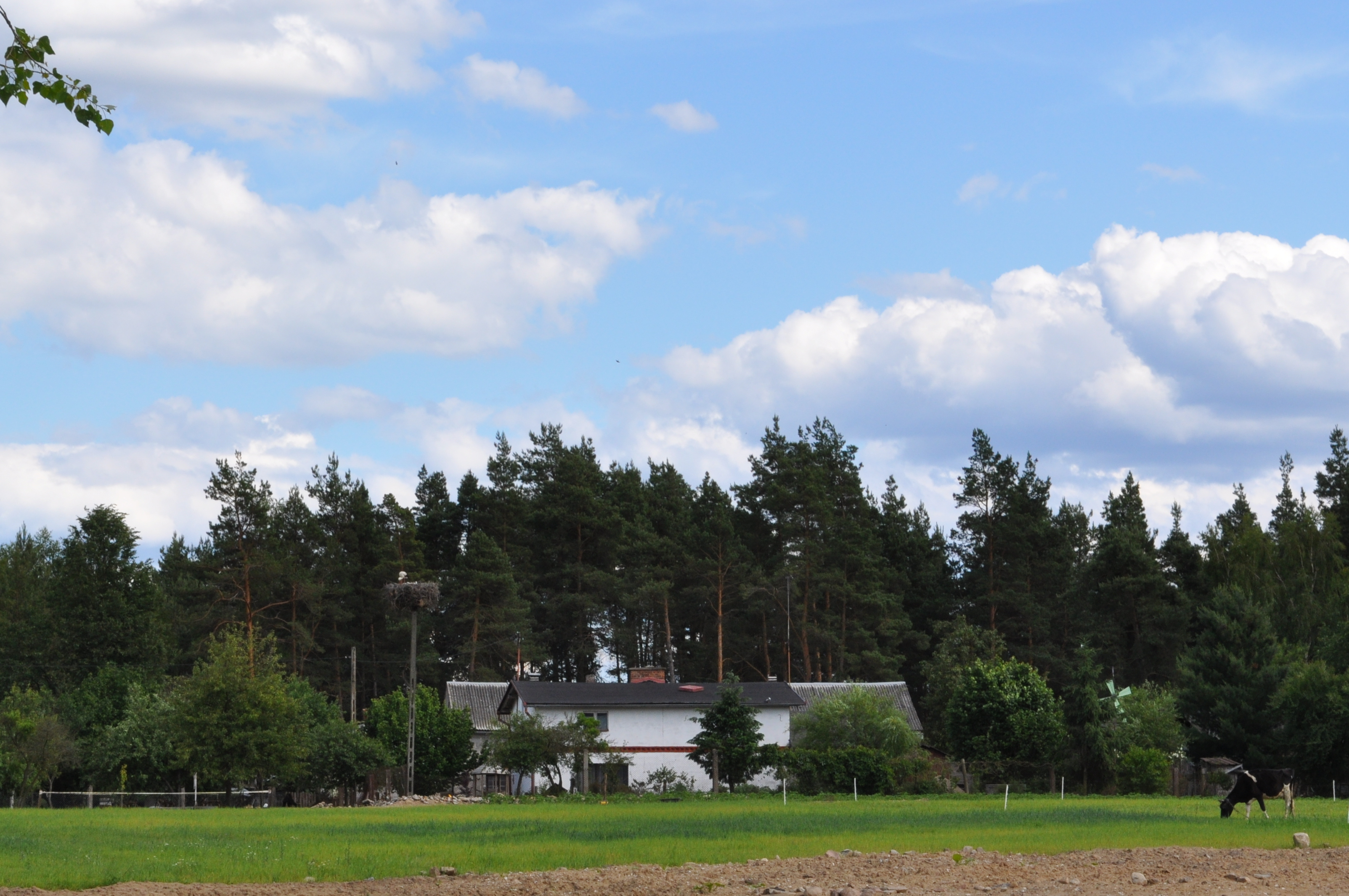

- Location within Poland
- Coordinates: 53°52′55″N 17°41′49″E
- Country: Poland
- Voivodeship: Pomeranian
- County: Chojnice
- Gmina: Brusy

Population
  - Total: 256
- Time zone: UTC+1 (CET)
  - Summer (DST): UTC+2 (CEST)
- Vehicle registration: GCH

Brusy Wybudowanie [ˈbrusɨ vɨbudɔˈvaɲɛ] (Kashubian: Brusë-Pùstczi) is a village in the administrative district of Gmina Brusy, within Chojnice County, Pomeranian Voivodeship, in northern Poland. It is located in the ethnocultural region of Kashubia in the historic region of Pomerania.
