= Rudziny, Pomeranian Voivodeship =

Village in Poland

Rudziny Rëdzënë
- Village
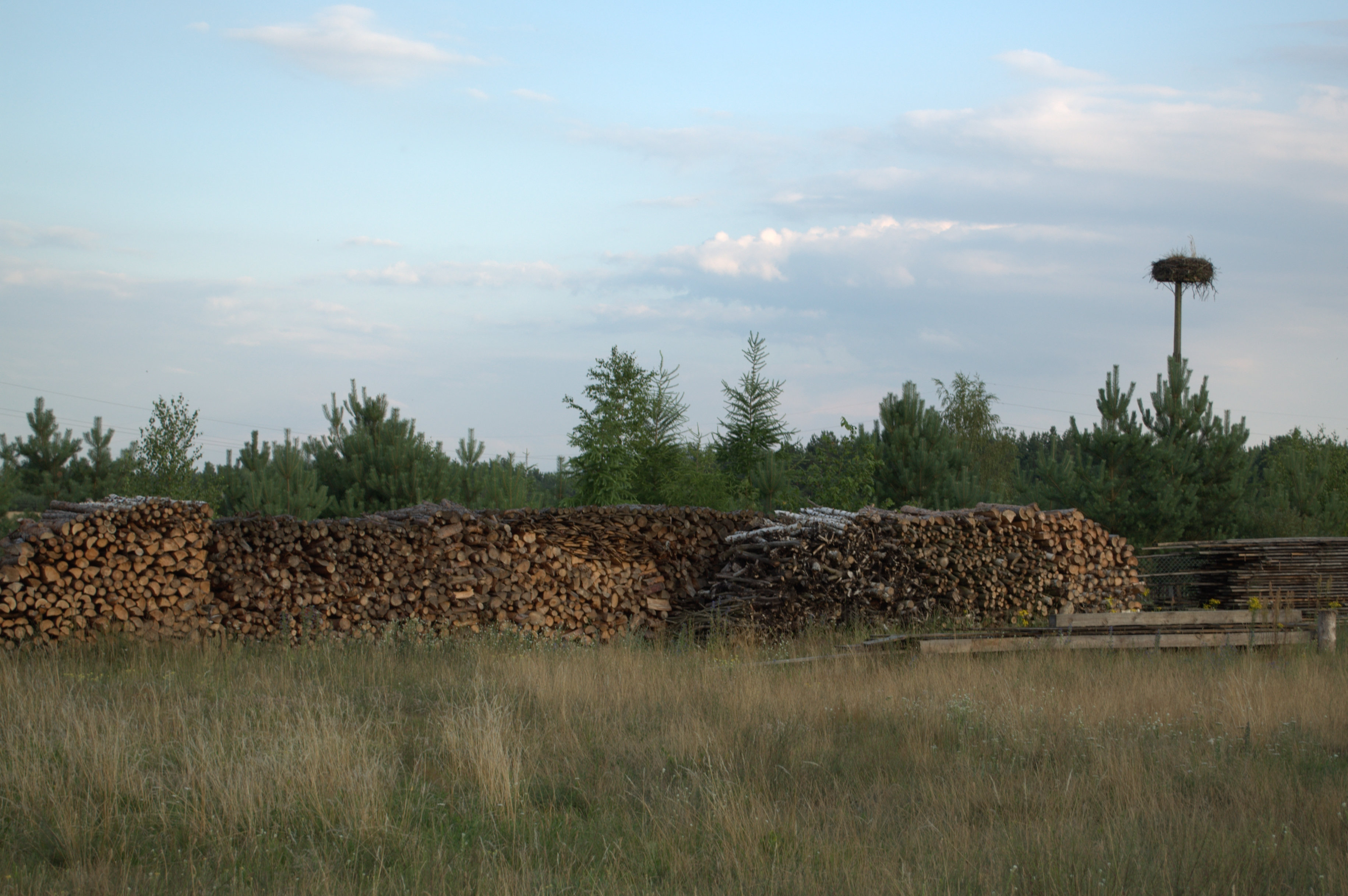

- Location within Poland
- Coordinates: 53°51′34″N 17°51′10″E
- Country: Poland
- Voivodeship: Pomeranian
- County: Chojnice
- Gmina: Brusy
- Population: 85

Rudziny [ruˈd͡ʑinɨ] (Kashubian: Rëdzënë) is a village in the administrative district of Gmina Brusy, within Chojnice County, Pomeranian Voivodeship, in northern Poland.

For details on the history of the region, see History of Pomerania.
