= Wawrzyn, Pomeranian Voivodeship =

Wawrzyn
- Settlement
- Country: Poland
- Voivodeship: Pomeranian
- County: Chojnice
- Gmina: Brusy

Wawrzyn [ˈvavʐɨn] is a settlement in the administrative district of Gmina Brusy, within Chojnice County, Pomeranian Voivodeship, in northern Poland.

For details of the history of the region, see History of Pomerania.
