= Gapowo, Chojnice County =

Gapowo
- Settlement
- Location within Poland
- Coordinates: 54°0′18″N 17°36′14″E
- Country: Poland
- Voivodeship: Pomeranian
- County: Chojnice
- Gmina: Brusy
- Time zone: UTC+1 (CET)
  - Summer (DST): UTC+2 (CEST)
- Vehicle registration: GCH

Gapowo [ɡaˈpɔvɔ] is a settlement in the administrative district of Gmina Brusy, within Chojnice County, Pomeranian Voivodeship, in northern Poland.
