= Parzyn =

Village in Poland

Parzyn Pôrzin
- Village
- Location within Poland
- Coordinates: 53°58′28″N 17°38′23″E
- Country: Poland
- Voivodeship: Pomeranian
- County: Chojnice
- Gmina: Brusy
- Population: 34

Parzyn [ˈpaʐɨn] (Kashubian: Pôrzin) is a village in the administrative district of Gmina Brusy, within Chojnice County, Pomeranian Voivodeship, in northern Poland.

For details of the history of the region, see History of Pomerania.
