= Kaszuby =

Kaszuby may refer to:

- Kashubia, a region in northern Poland, Kaszëbë in Kashubian, Kaszuby in Polish
- Kaszuby, Lublin Voivodeship, East Poland
- Kaszuby, Ontario, Canada
