= Kaszuba Leśna =

- Settlement
- Location within Poland
- Coordinates: 53°56′28″N 17°36′26″E
- Country: Poland
- Voivodeship: Pomeranian
- County: Chojnice
- Gmina: Brusy

Kaszuba Leśna [kaˈʂuba ˈlɛɕna] is a settlement in the administrative district of Gmina Brusy, within Chojnice County, Pomeranian Voivodeship, in northern Poland.

For details of the history of the region, see History of Pomerania.
