= Żabno, Chojnice County =

Żabno Żôbno
- Village
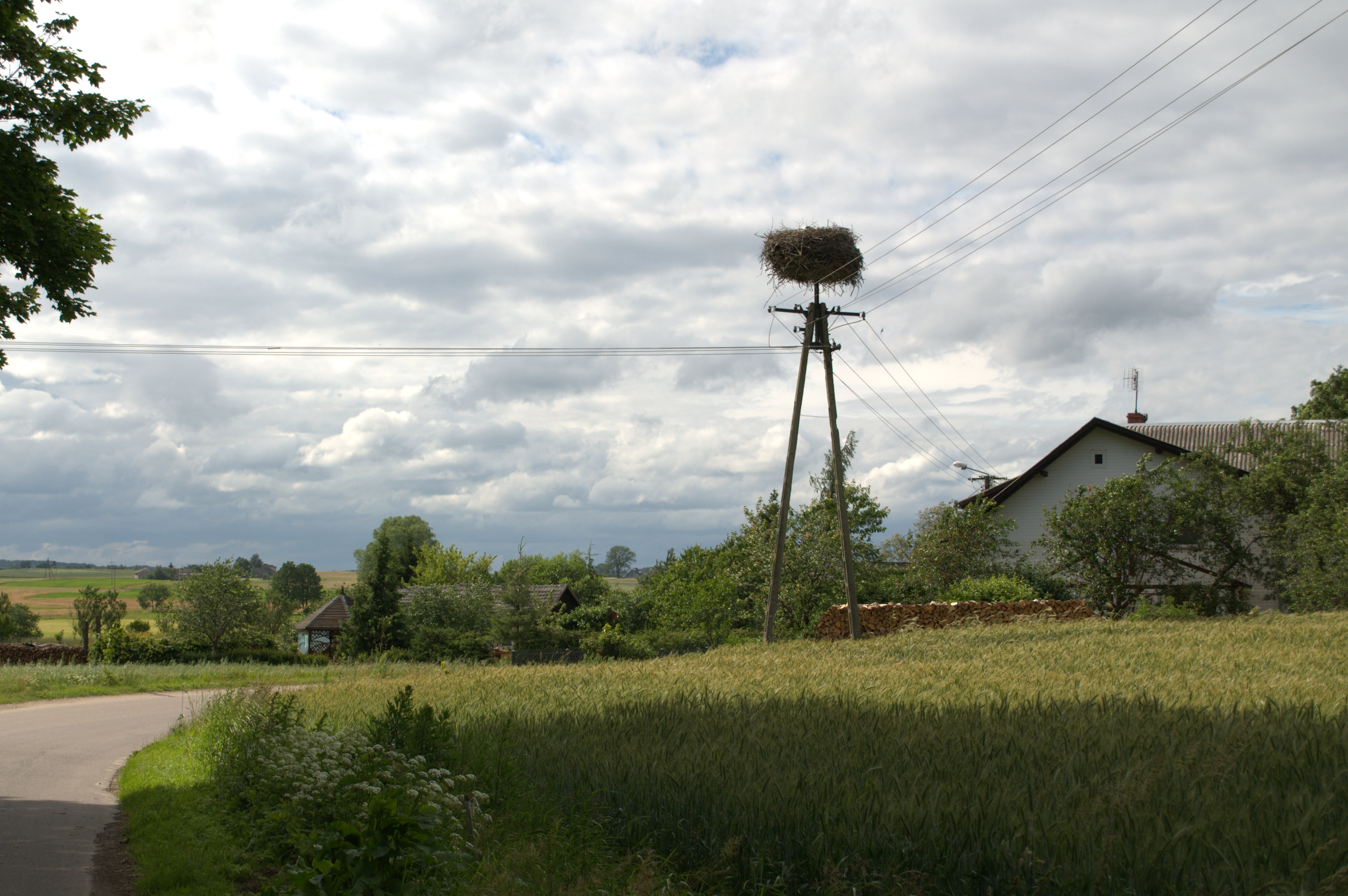
- A white stork's nest on a telephone pole in the village

- Location within Poland
- Coordinates: 53°51′51″N 17°42′6″E
- Country: Poland
- Voivodeship: Pomeranian
- County: Chojnice
- Gmina: Brusy
- Population: 227

Żabno [ˈʐabnɔ] (Kashubian: Żôbno) is a village in the administrative district of Gmina Brusy, within Chojnice County, Pomeranian Voivodeship, in northern Poland.

For details of the history of the region, see History of Pomerania.
