= Romualdas Kasuba =

- Born: March 23, 1931; Kaunas, Lithuania
- Died: October 19, 2019 (aged 88)
- Education: University of Illinois
- Scientific career
- Fields: engineering, aerospace engineering
- Workplaces: Vytautas Magnus University, Cleveland State University, Northern Illinois University

Romualdas Kasuba (March 23, 1931 – October 19, 2019; Lithuanian: Romualdas Kašuba) was a Lithuanian American academician and mechanical engineer.

== Biography ==
Kasubas' family planned to flee Lithuania in 1940; the family was threatened with being sent to Siberia by the Soviet regime because his mother was a teacher. However, after the German invasion, Kasuba was instead put to work on a farm supplying food to the German army. Kasuba moved to Germany in 1944, and he then lived in a displaced persons camp and emigrated to the United States in 1948.

Kasuba graduated from University of Illinois in 1954. He earned a doctoral degree in 1962. Kasuba taught at Cleveland State University from 1964 to 1986, where he also chaired the Department of Mechanical Engineering. In 1986 Kasuba co-founded the College of Engineering at Northern Illinois University and became its dean. From 1989 to 1996, Kasuba was a member of senate at Vytautas Magnus University in Kaunas, Lithuania.

Kasuba died in 2019 at age 88.

== Awards and recognition ==
- 1998: Honorary doctorate from the Kaunas University of Technology
- 1999: The National Academy of Sciences of Lithuania elected him an international member of the academy
- 1999: The Diamond Award from the UNESCO International Engineering Education Center for the best paper
- In February 2011, an auditorium at Northern Illinois University was named in Kasuba's honor.
