= Stanisław Pestka =

Polish/Kashubian poet, journalist (1929–2015)

- Stanisłôw Pestka
- Born: April 8, 1929; Rólbiék, Poland
- Died: April 2, 2015 (aged 85); Gduńsk, Poland
- Other names: Jan Zbrzyca; Krëban z Milachòwa
- Education: Adam Mickiewicz University in Poznań
- Organization: Kashubian-Pomeranian Association
- Board member of: Kaszëbskò-Pòmòrsczé Zrzeszenié

Stanisław Pestka (8 April 1929 – 2 April 2015) was a Kashubian poet. He was born in Rolbik. Pestka was also a translator of Russian texts into Kashubian language. He was the chairman of Kashubian-Pomeranian Association from 1976 to 1980 and again from 1992 to 1994. He was a Kashubian activist. He died in 2015.

== Publications ==
In 1950 he graduated from the Jozef Wybicki High School in Kościerzyna, and in 1953 he studied Polish Studies at the University of Poznan. After graduation, he worked as a teacher. In 1958 he settled in Gdańsk, cooperated with the magazine Kaszëbë until its liquidation in 1961, in 1961-1965 headed the cultural department of the Ilustrowany Kurier Polski (Illustrated Polish Courier), in 1965-1967 worked at the Polish Radio Broadcasting Station in Szczecin, in 1967-1968 at the magazine Fakty i Myśli (Facts and Thoughts). From 1968 he lived in Gdańsk again, and was a member of the editorial board of the magazine Litery (1968-1974), the weekly Czas (1975-1981). At the same time he was editor-in-chief of the Pomerania monthly (1969-1972). In the 1980s he worked at the Provincial Cultural Center in Gdańsk, and was again editor-in-chief of Pomerania from 1990-1994.

He published poetry under the pen name Jan Zbrzyca, and his articles and feuilletons were signed Krëban z Milachòwa. (The word krëban or kùrban literally denoting a jar for storing animal fat, while Krëbans also refers to an ethnic subgroup of Kashubians.)

- Południca, Gdańsk 1976
- Wizrë ë duchë, Gdańsk 1986; ISBN 83-85011-09-9
- Wieczòrny widnik, 2002
- W krainie chmurników, 2011, collection of prose

== Bibliography ==
- J. Drzeżdżon, "Współczesna literatura kaszubska 1945-1980", Warszawa 1986
- Polish bibliography
- "Z zaborskiego matecznika. O Stanisławie Pestce - Janie Zbrzycy", pod red. J. Borzyszkowskiego, Gdańsk 2008.
