= Lasca, Texas =

Ghost town in Texas, United States

Coordinates: 31°14′04″N 105°28′30″W

Lasca is a ghost town located in Hudspeth County, Texas, United States, west of Sierra Blanca and east of El Paso. It is situated at an elevation of 4459 feet above sea level (1359 meters).
