= Václav Láska =

Václav Láska may refer to:

- Václav Láska (mathematician) (1862–1943), Czech astronomer, geophysicist, and mathematician
- Václav Láska (politician) (born 1974), Czech politician
