= Lendy =

Village in Pomeranian Voivodeship, Poland

Lendy Lãdë
- Village
- Location within Poland
- Coordinates: 54°0′10″N 17°40′42″E
- Country: Poland
- Voivodeship: Pomeranian
- County: Chojnice
- Gmina: Brusy
- Time zone: UTC+1 (CET)
  - Summer (DST): UTC+2 (CEST)
- Vehicle registration: GCH

Lendy [ˈlɛndɨ] (Kashubian: Lãdë) is a village in the administrative district of Gmina Brusy, within Chojnice County, Pomeranian Voivodeship, in northern Poland. It is located in the ethnocultural region of Kashubia in the historic region of Pomerania.
