= Przymuszewo, Chojnice County =

Village in Poland

Przymuszewo Przëmùszewò
- Village
- Location within Poland
- Coordinates: 53°59′57″N 17°39′58″E
- Country: Poland
- Voivodeship: Pomeranian
- County: Chojnice
- Gmina: Brusy
- Population: 77

Przymuszewo [pʂɨmuˈʂɛvɔ] (Kashubian: Przëmùszewò) is a village in the administrative district of Gmina Brusy, within Chojnice County, Pomeranian Voivodeship, in northern Poland.

For details of the history of the region, see History of Pomerania.
