= Asmus v. Pacific Bell =

US labor law case

- Court: California Supreme Court
- Citation: 23 Cal.4th 1; 999 P2d 71 (2000)

Keywords
- Job security, contract variation

Asmus v. Pacific Bell, 23 Cal.4th 1 (2000) is a US labor law case, concerning the scope of federal preemption against state law for labor rights.

== Facts ==
In 1986, Pacific Bell's "Management Employment Security Policy" stated it would ensure its staff has a right to be reassigned to different jobs and retrained if their existing jobs were eliminated. But in 1990 it withdrew this right. Sixty management employees claimed this withdrawal was unlawful.

== Judgment ==
The California Supreme Court (Chin J giving judgment, Baxter J, Brown J and Haller J concurring) held an employment policy promising long term job security to a firm's managers can be modified if (1) the policy is one of 'indefinite duration' (2) the policy is in effect for a 'reasonable time' (3) 'reasonable notice' was given for a change, and (4) no 'vested benefits' are affected by the change.

George CJ dissented. Mosk J and Kennard J concurred in the dissent.

The majority endorses a patently unfair, indeed unconscionable, result — permitting an employer that made a promise of continuing job security to its employees in order to retain their services during a period of good job prospects, to repudiate that promise with impunity several years later when the employer determined that it was no longer in its interest to honor its earlier commitment.

== See also ==
- United States labor law
