= Lendi Vexer =

- Natalie Naveira playing Theremin

Background information
- Origin: Buenos Aires, Argentina
- Genres: Trip hop, electronic, alternative rock, ambient
- Years active: 2000–present
- Label: Stereotape Records
- Members: Natalie Naveira, Diego Guiñazu DG
- Website: lendivexer.com.ar

Lendi Vexer are a trip hop duo from Buenos Aires, Argentina. The two members of the band are Natalie Naveira and Diego Guiñazu, who uses the stage name DG. They have both been making music since 1995 and formed the band in 2000. They are accompanied by a guitarist and drummer when playing live.

== Band lineup ==
- Natalie Naveira – Multi-instrumentalist, including guitar, violin, piano accordion and theremin; singer and songwriter
- DG – Plays sampler, Moog and bass; producer and songwriter

== Discography ==
=== Suicidal adage EP (2004) ===
Track listing:

- Tribute to desolation
- 'scape
- Nothing was special
- Suicidal adage.
- Bonus Track with Natalie in Theremin.

=== The Process of Disillusion album (2007) ===
Track listing:

- 11 de octubre
- To play again
- A boot doesn't ask, just trample
- Courtesy excess
- Simple cycle
- A slow dripping in my brain
- Looking for my time
- Burdel
- The Process Of Disillusion
- Missing time
- Suicidal adage (Spanish version)
- That fish and the bait
- La

=== Princess of Nothingness CD (2014) ===
Track listing:

- Desert
- Luna de sal
- Princess of Nothingness
- Stormy clouds

=== Princess of Nothingness LIMITED EDITION on 7" VINYL (2014) ===
Track listing:

- Desert
- Luna de sal
- Princess of Nothingness
- Stormy clouds

DOWNLOAD CARD: three rare versions.

=== Stormy Clouds Remixed EP (2016) ===
Track listing:

- Stormy Clouds (The Soulmate Project Remix)
- Stormy Clouds (UBM Remix)
- Stormy Clouds (DYREK Remix)

=== w.e.b. wicked electronic beats vol.1 Trip Hop Compilation (2005) ===
Edited by: Tripofagia.com (Trip Hop portal – off line)

Featured: "Tribute to desolation" by Lendi Vexer and other trip hop artists such as U-topia, Lovage (Mike Patton), etc.
