= Młynek, Chojnice County =

Settlement in Pomeranian Voivodeship, Poland

Młynek Młink
- Village
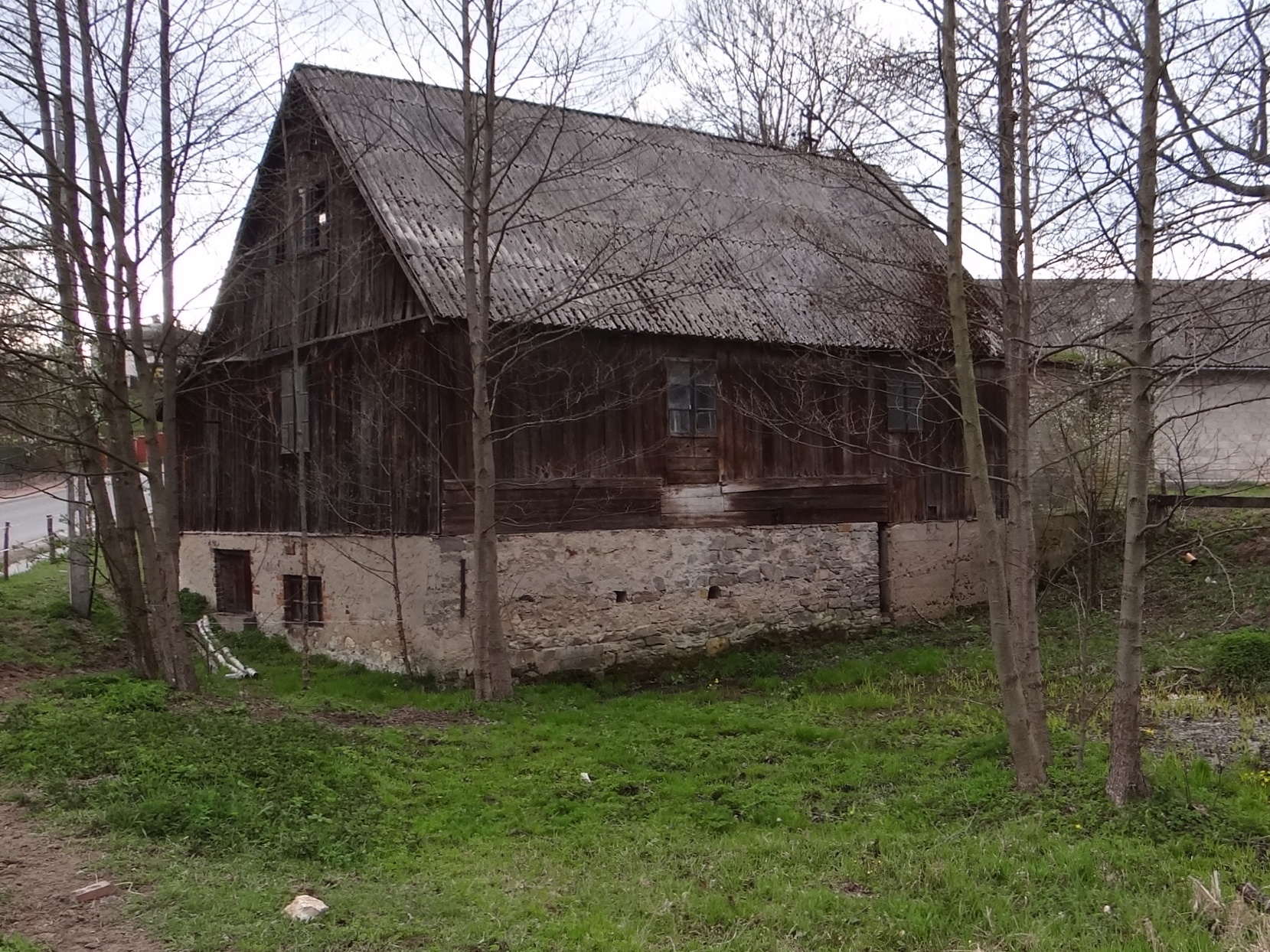

- Location within Poland
- Coordinates: 53°52′18″N 17°33′59″E
- Country: Poland
- Voivodeship: Pomeranian
- County: Chojnice
- Gmina: Brusy
- Time zone: UTC+1 (CET)
  - Summer (DST): UTC+2 (CEST)
- Vehicle registration: GCH

Młynek [ˈmwɨnɛk] (Kashubian: Młink) is a village in the administrative district of Gmina Brusy, within Chojnice County, Pomeranian Voivodeship, in northern Poland. It is located in the ethnocultural region of Kashubia in the historic region of Pomerania.
