= Rolbik =

Village in Poland

Rolbik Rólbiék
- Village
- Location within Poland
- Coordinates: 53°55′42″N 17°34′48″E
- Country: Poland
- Voivodeship: Pomeranian
- County: Chojnice
- Gmina: Brusy
- Population: 129
- Time zone: UTC+1 (CET)
  - Summer (DST): UTC+2 (CEST)
- Vehicle registration: GCH

Rolbik [ˈrɔlbik] (Kashubian: Rólbiék) is a village in the administrative district of Gmina Brusy, within Chojnice County, Pomeranian Voivodeship, in northern Poland. It is located within the ethnocultural region of Kashubia in the historic region of Pomerania.

Rolbik was a royal village of the Polish Crown, administratively located in the Tuchola County in the Pomeranian Voivodeship.

== Notable people ==
- Stanisław Pestka (1929–2015) a Kashubian poet
