= Gmina Brusy =

Gmina Brusy Brusy Commune
- Gmina
- Flag Coat of arms
- Interactive map of Gmina Brusy
- Coordinates (Brusy): 53°53′8″N 17°43′19″E
- Country: Poland
- Voivodeship: Pomeranian
- County: Chojnice
- Seat: Brusy

Area
  - Total: 400.74 km^{2} (154.73 sq mi)

Population (2006)
  - Total: 13,129
  - Density: 32.762/km^{2} (84.853/sq mi)
  - Urban: 4,582
  - Rural: 8,547
- Website: http://www.brusy.pl/

Gmina Brusy is an urban-rural gmina (administrative district) in Chojnice County, Pomeranian Voivodeship, in northern Poland. Its seat is the town of Brusy, which lies approximately 24 kilometres (15 mi) north-east of Chojnice and 80 km (50 mi) south-west of the regional capital Gdańsk.

The gmina covers an area of 400.74 square kilometres (154.7 sq mi), and as of 2006 its total population is 13,129, of which the population of Brusy is 4,582, and the population of the rural part of the gmina is 8,547.

The gmina contains part of the protected area called Zaborski Landscape Park.

== Villages ==
Apart from the town of Brusy, Gmina Brusy contains the villages and settlements of Antoniewo, Asmus, Broda, Brusy Wybudowanie, Brusy-Jaglie, Chłopowy, Czapiewice, Czapiewice Wybudowanie, Czarniż, Czarnowo, Czernica, Czyczkowy, Czyczkowy Wybudowanie, Dąbrówka, Gacnik, Gapowo, Giełdon, Główczewice, Huta, Kaszuba, Kaszuba Leśna, Kinice, Kosobudy, Krównia, Kruszyn, Kubinowo, Lamk, Laska, Lendy, Leśno, Lubnia, Małe Chełmy, Małe Gliśno, Męcikał, Męcikał-Struga, Młynek, Okręglik, Orlik, Parowa, Parzyn, Peplin, Pokrzywno, Przymuszewo, Rolbik, Rudziny, Skoszewo, Spierwia, Turowiec, Wawrzyn, Widno, Wielkie Chełmy, Windorp, Wysoka Zaborska, Żabno, Zalesie and Zimna Kawa.

== Neighbouring gminas ==
Gmina Brusy is bordered by the gminas of Chojnice, Czersk, Dziemiany, Karsin, Lipnica and Studzienice.
