= Widno, Chojnice County =

Widno
- Village
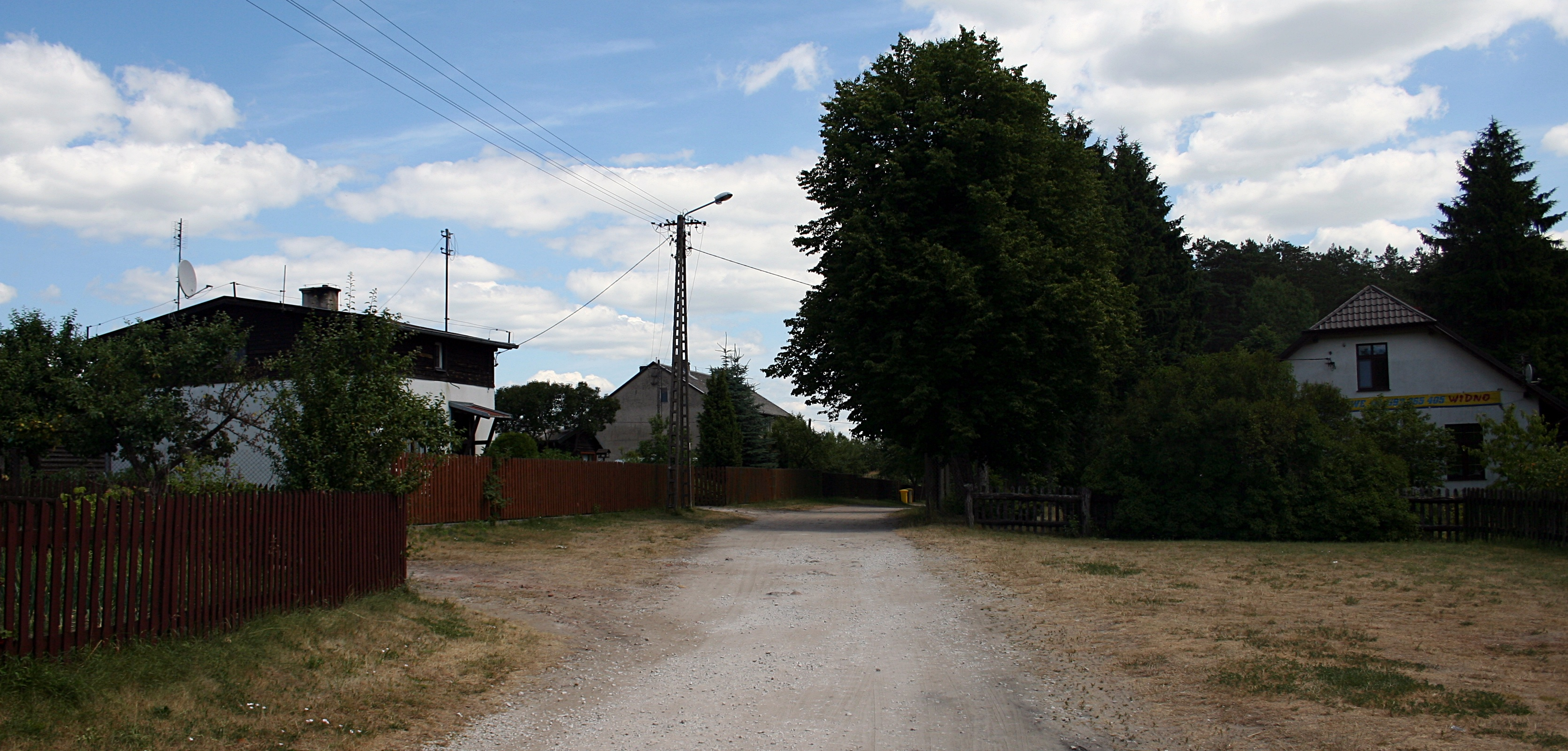

- Location within Poland
- Coordinates: 53°56′0″N 17°32′35″E
- Country: Poland
- Voivodeship: Pomeranian
- County: Chojnice
- Gmina: Brusy
- Population: 61

Widno [ˈvidnɔ] is a village in the administrative district of Gmina Brusy, within Chojnice County, Pomeranian Voivodeship, in northern Poland.

For details of the history of the region, see History of Pomerania.
