= Kaszuba, Pomeranian Voivodeship =

Village in Pomeranian Voivodeship, Poland

Kaszuba Kaszëba
- Village
- Location within Poland
- Coordinates: 53°56′46″N 17°39′2″E
- Country: Poland
- Voivodeship: Pomeranian
- County: Chojnice
- Gmina: Brusy

Population
  - Total: 97
- Time zone: UTC+1 (CET)
  - Summer (DST): UTC+2 (CEST)
- Vehicle registration: GCH

Kaszuba [kaˈʂuba] (Kashubian: Kaszëba) is a village in the administrative district of Gmina Brusy, within Chojnice County, Pomeranian Voivodeship, in northern Poland. It is located in the ethnocultural region of Kashubia in the historic region of Pomerania.
