= Męcikał railway station =

Railway station in Męcikał, Poland

Coordinates: 53°49′56″N 17°40′15″E

Męcikał

General information
- Location: Męcikał; Poland
- Owner: Polskie Koleje Państwowe S.A.
- Line: 211: Chojnice–Kościerzyna railway

Construction
- Structure type: Building: Yes (no longer used); Depot: Never existed Water tower: Never existed

History
- Former names: Menzig until 1945

Services
Preceding station	Polregio	Following station
Powałki towards Chojnice	PR	Żabno k. Chojnic towards Kościerzyna
Location

Męcikał is a PKP railway station in Męcikał (Pomeranian Voivodeship), Poland.

== Lines crossing the station ==
Start station	End station	Line type
Chojnice	Kościerzyna	Passenger/Freight

== Train services ==
The station is served by the following services:

- Regional services (R) Chojnice - Brusy - Lipusz - Koscierzyna
