= Rytel railway station =

Railway station in Rytel, Poland

Coordinates: 53.7483°N 17.7256°E

Rytel
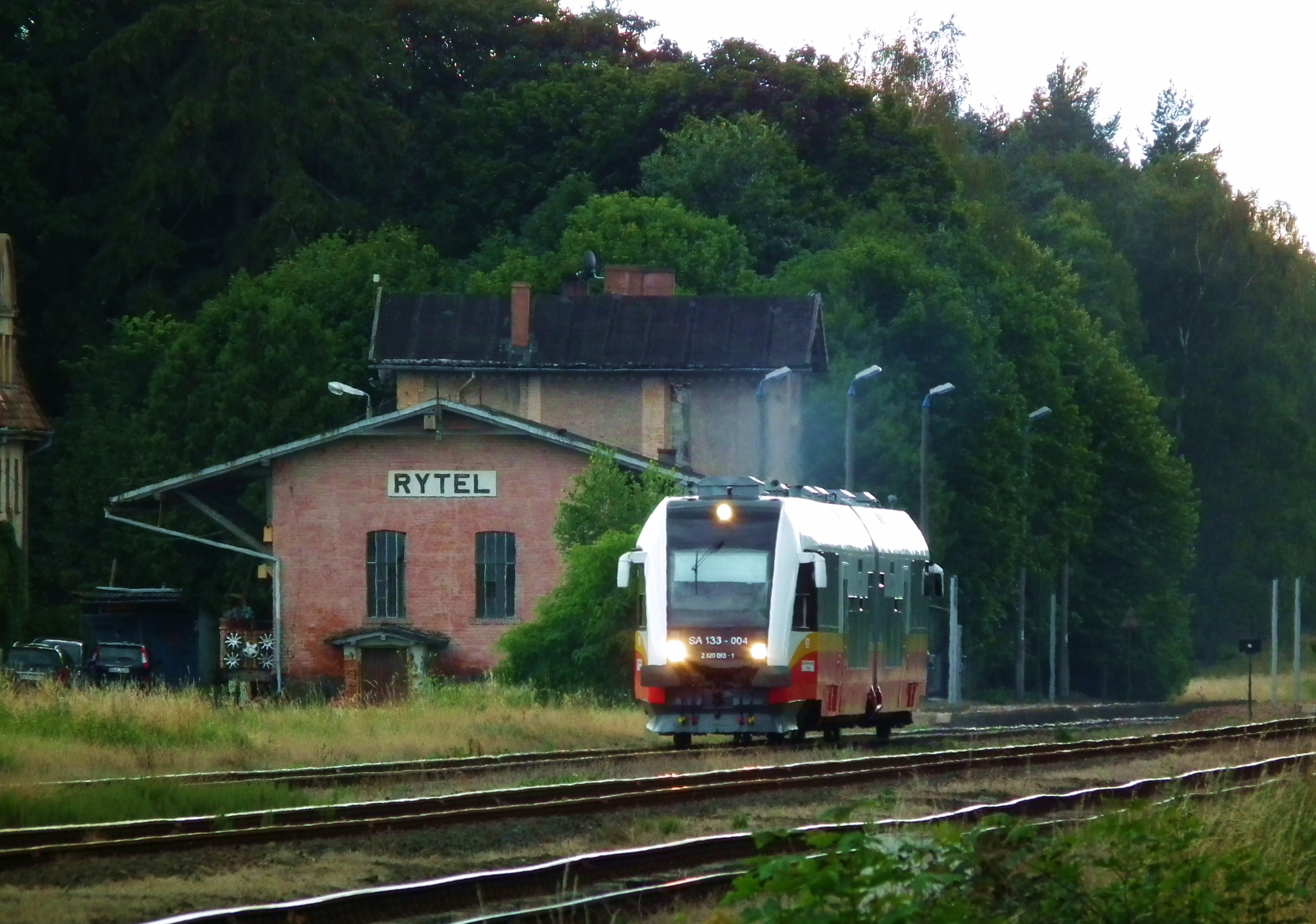

General information
- Location: Rytel; Poland
- Owner: Polskie Koleje Państwowe S.A.
- Line: 203: Tczew–Kostrzyn railway
- Platforms: 2

Construction
- Structure type: Building: Yes; Depot: Never existed Water tower: Never existed

History
- Former names: Rittel

Services
Preceding station	Polregio	Following station
Rytel Wieś towards Tczew	PR	Krojanty towards Chojnice
Location

Rytel is a PKP railway station in Rytel, Pomeranian Voivodeship, Poland.

== Lines crossing the station ==
Start station	End station	Line type
Tczew	Küstrin-Kietz	Passenger/Freight

== Train services ==
The station is served by the following service(s):

- Regional services (R) Chojnice - Czarna Woda - Starogard Gdanski - Tczew
