= Lubnia railway station =

Railway station in Lubnia, Poland

Lubnia
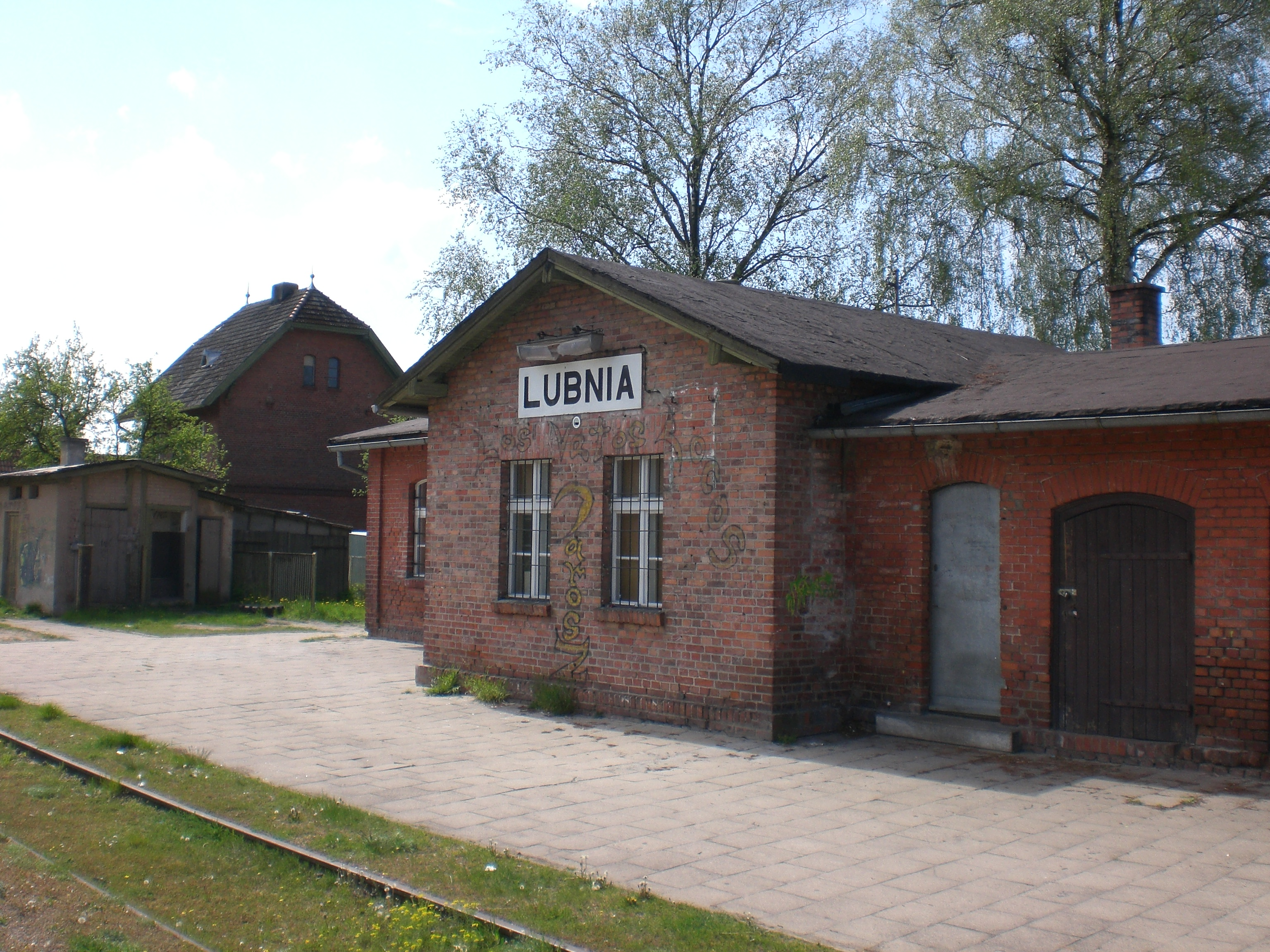

General information
- Location: Lubnia; Poland
- Coordinates: 53.9355°N 17.7420°E
- Owner: Polskie Koleje Państwowe S.A.
- Line: 211: Chojnice–Kościerzyna railway
- Platforms: 1

Construction
- Structure type: Building: No; Depot: No; Water tower: No

History
- Former names: Lübbenberg until 1945

Services
Preceding station	Polregio	Following station
Brusy towards Chojnice	PR	Raduń towards Kościerzyna
Location

Lubnia is a PKP railway station in Lubnia (Pomeranian Voivodeship), Poland.

== Lines crossing the station ==
Start station	End station	Line type
Chojnice	Kościerzyna	Passenger/Freight

== Train services ==
The station is served by the following services:

- Regional services (R) Chojnice - Brusy - Lipusz - Koscierzyna
