= Gutowiec railway station =

Railway station in Gutowiec, Poland

Coordinates: 53.7769°N 17.8600°E

Gutowiec
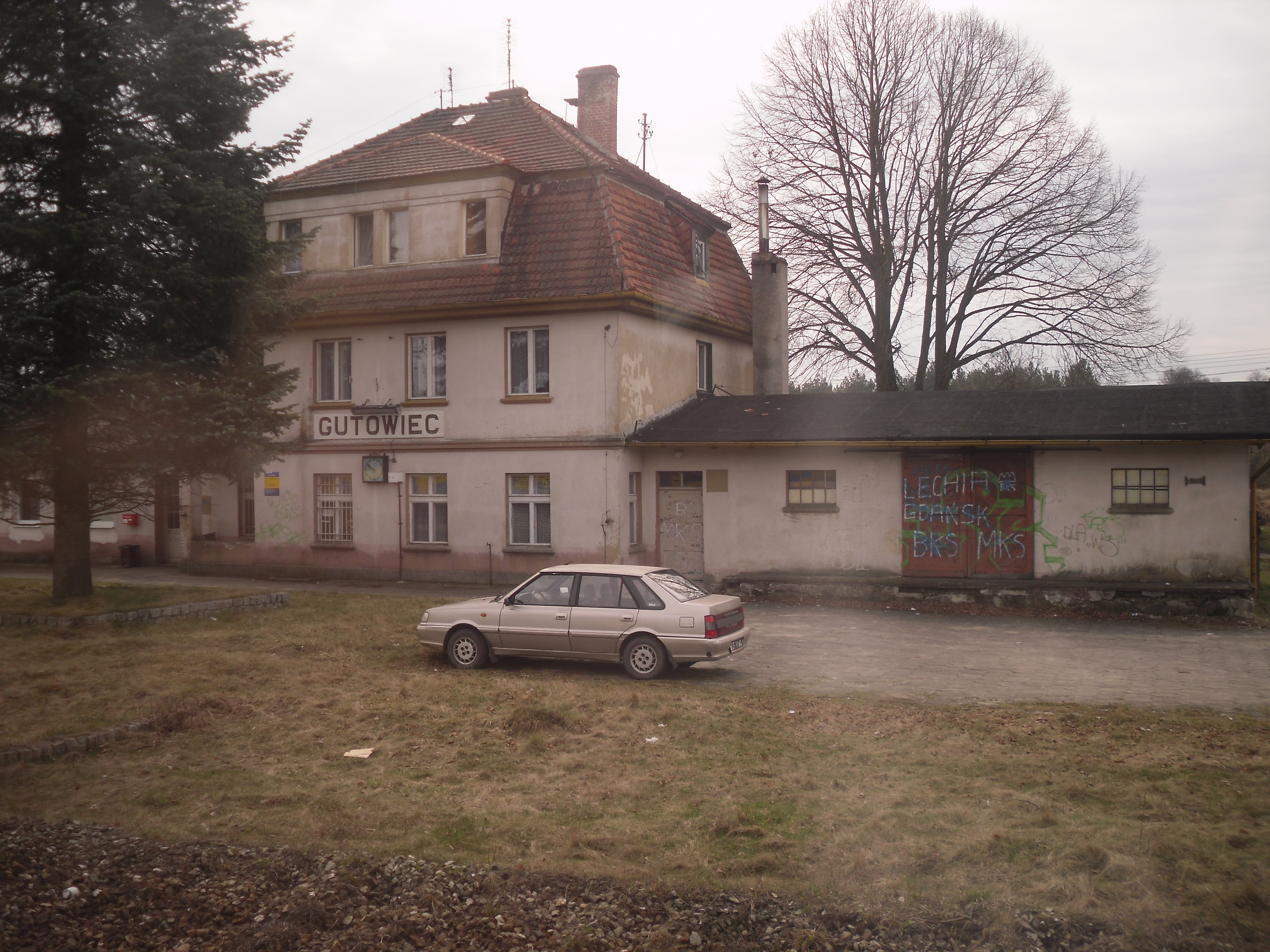

General information
- Location: Gutowiec; Poland
- Owner: Polskie Koleje Państwowe S.A.
- Lines: 203: Tczew–Kostrzyn railway 215: Będźmirowice–Karsin railway

Construction
- Structure type: Depot: Never existed Water tower: No

History
- Former names: Gutenwirt

Services
Preceding station	Polregio	Following station
Rytel Wieś towards Chojnice	PR	Czersk towards Tczew
Location

Gutowiec is a PKP railway station in Gutowiec (Pomeranian Voivodeship), Poland.

== Lines crossing the station ==
Start station	End station	Line type
Tczew	Küstrin-Kietz	Passenger/Freight

== Train services ==
The station is served by the following service(s):

- Regional services (R) Chojnice - Czarna Woda - Starogard Gdanski - Tczew
