= Lipuska Huta railway station =

Railway station in Lipuska Huta, Poland

Coordinates: 54.0700°N 17.7669°E

Lipuska Huta
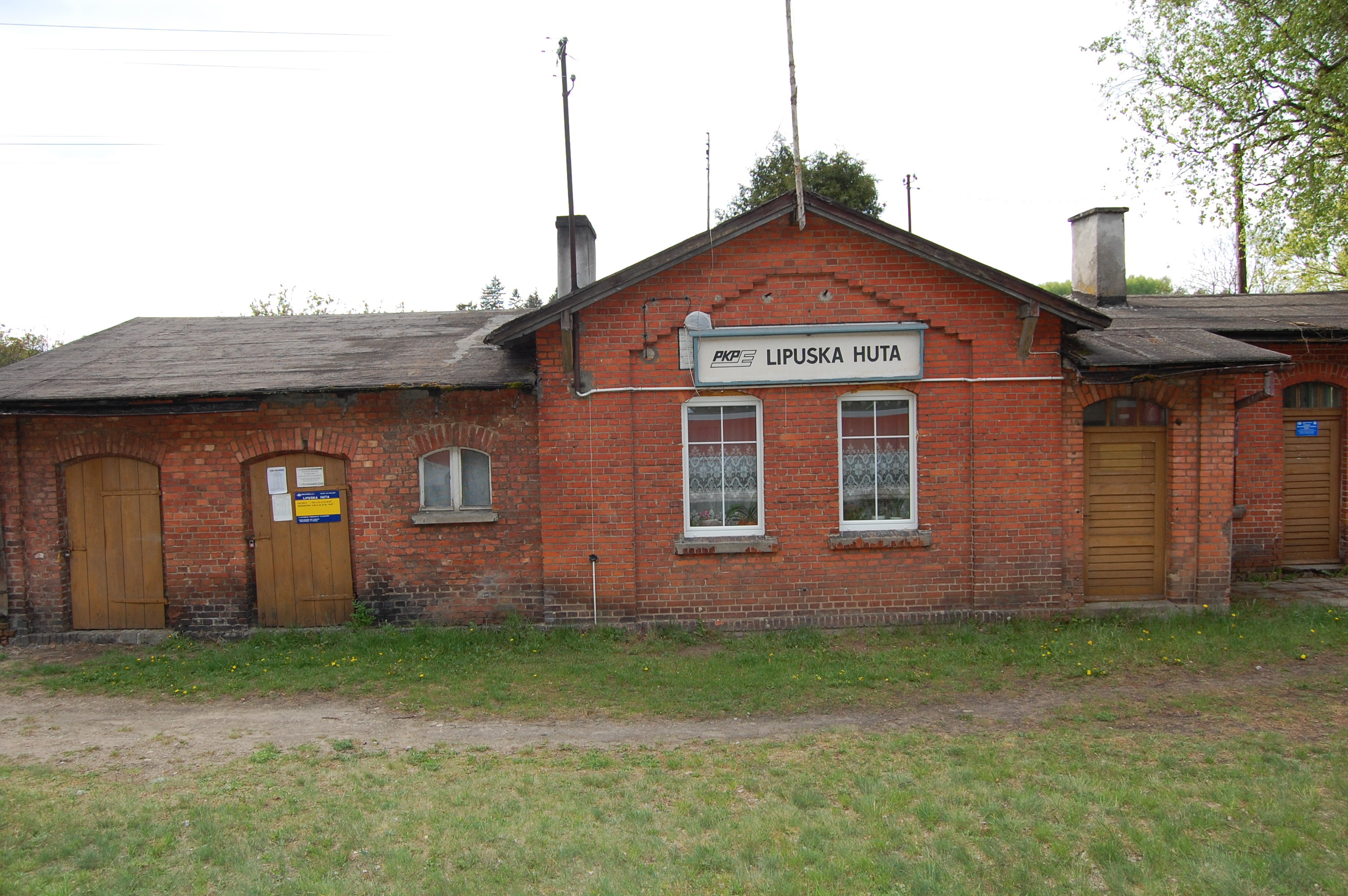
- The station in 2009

General information
- Location: Lipuska Huta; Poland
- Owner: Polskie Koleje Państwowe S.A.
- Line: 211: Chojnice–Kościerzyna railway

Construction
- Structure type: Building: Yes (no longer used); Depot: No; Water tower: No

History
- Former names: Grüntal until 1945

Services
Preceding station	Polregio	Following station
Kalisz Kaszubski towards Chojnice	PR	Lipusz towards Kościerzyna
Location

Lipuska Huta is a PKP railway station in Lipuska Huta (Pomeranian Voivodeship), Poland.

== Lines crossing the station ==
Start station	End station	Line type
Chojnice	Kościerzyna	Passenger/Freight

== Train services ==
The station is served by the following services:

- Regional services (R) Chojnice - Brusy - Lipusz - Koscierzyna
