= Kalisz Kaszubski railway station =

Railway station in Pomeranian Voivodeship, Poland

Kalisz Kaszubski
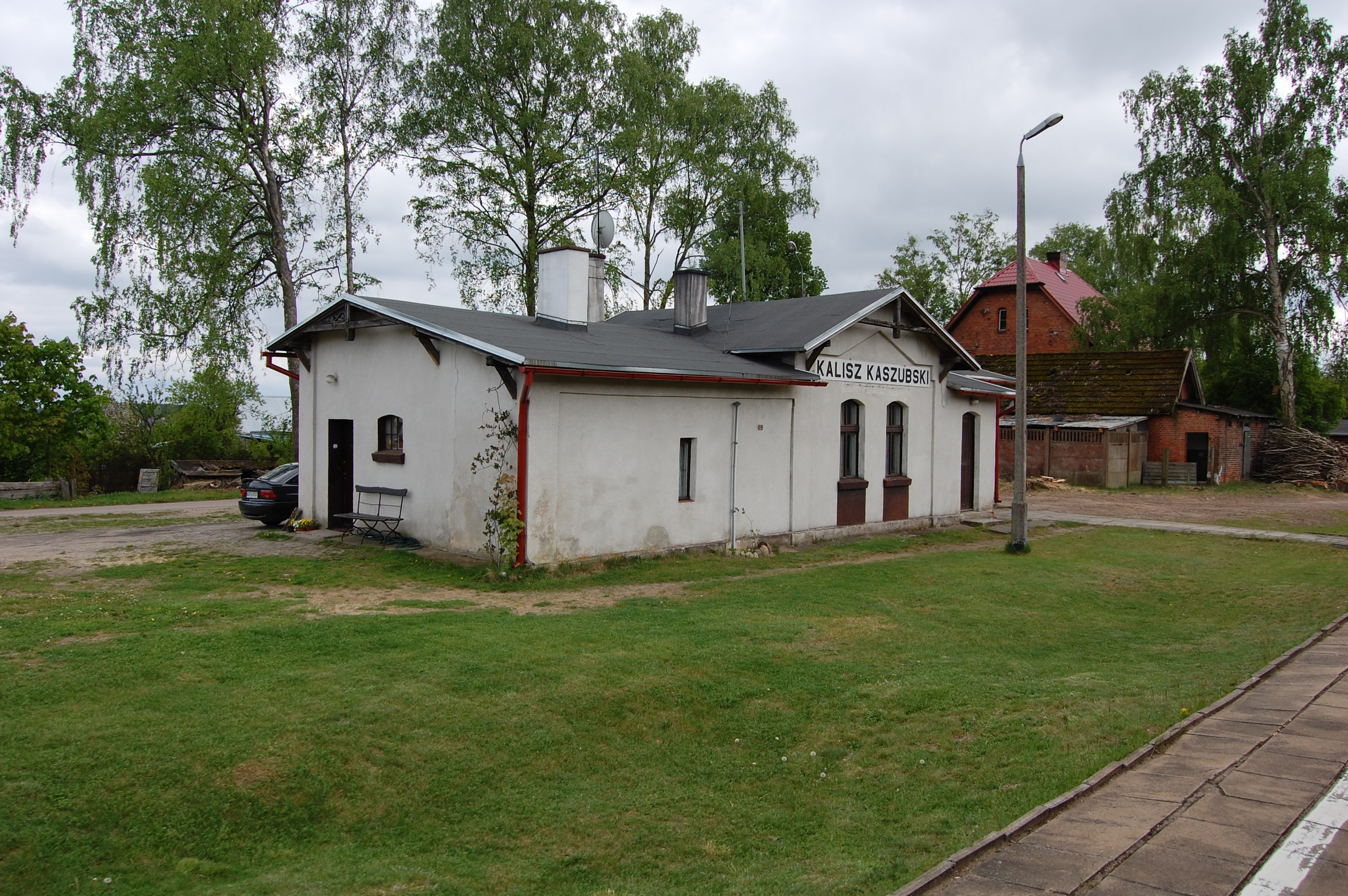

General information
- Location: Kalisz Kaszubski; Poland
- Coordinates: 54.044897°N 17.786354°E
- Owner: Polskie Koleje Państwowe S.A.
- Line: 211: Chojnice–Kościerzyna railway
- Platforms: 1

Construction
- Structure type: Building: Yes; Depot: Never existed Water tower: Never existed

History
- Former names: Kalish (Kr. Berent) until 1945

Services
Preceding station	Polregio	Following station
Dziemiany Kaszubskie towards Chojnice	PR	Lipuska Huta towards Kościerzyna
Location

Kalisz Kaszubski is a PKP railway station in Kalisz Kaszubski (Pomeranian Voivodeship), Poland.

== Lines crossing the station ==
Start station	End station	Line type
Chojnice	Kościerzyna	Passenger/Freight

== Train services ==
The station is served by the following services:

- Regional services (R) Chojnice - Brusy - Lipusz - Koscierzyna
