= Powałki railway station =

Railway station in Powałki, Poland

Coordinates: 53°44′35″N 17°36′00″E

Powałki

General information
- Location: Powałki; Poland
- Owner: Polskie Koleje Państwowe S.A.
- Line: 211: Chojnice–Kościerzyna railway

Construction
- Structure type: Building: No; Depot: No; Water tower: No

History
- Former names: Wölkenfeld until 1945

Services
Preceding station	Polregio	Following station
Chojnice Terminus	PR	Męcikał towards Kościerzyna
Location

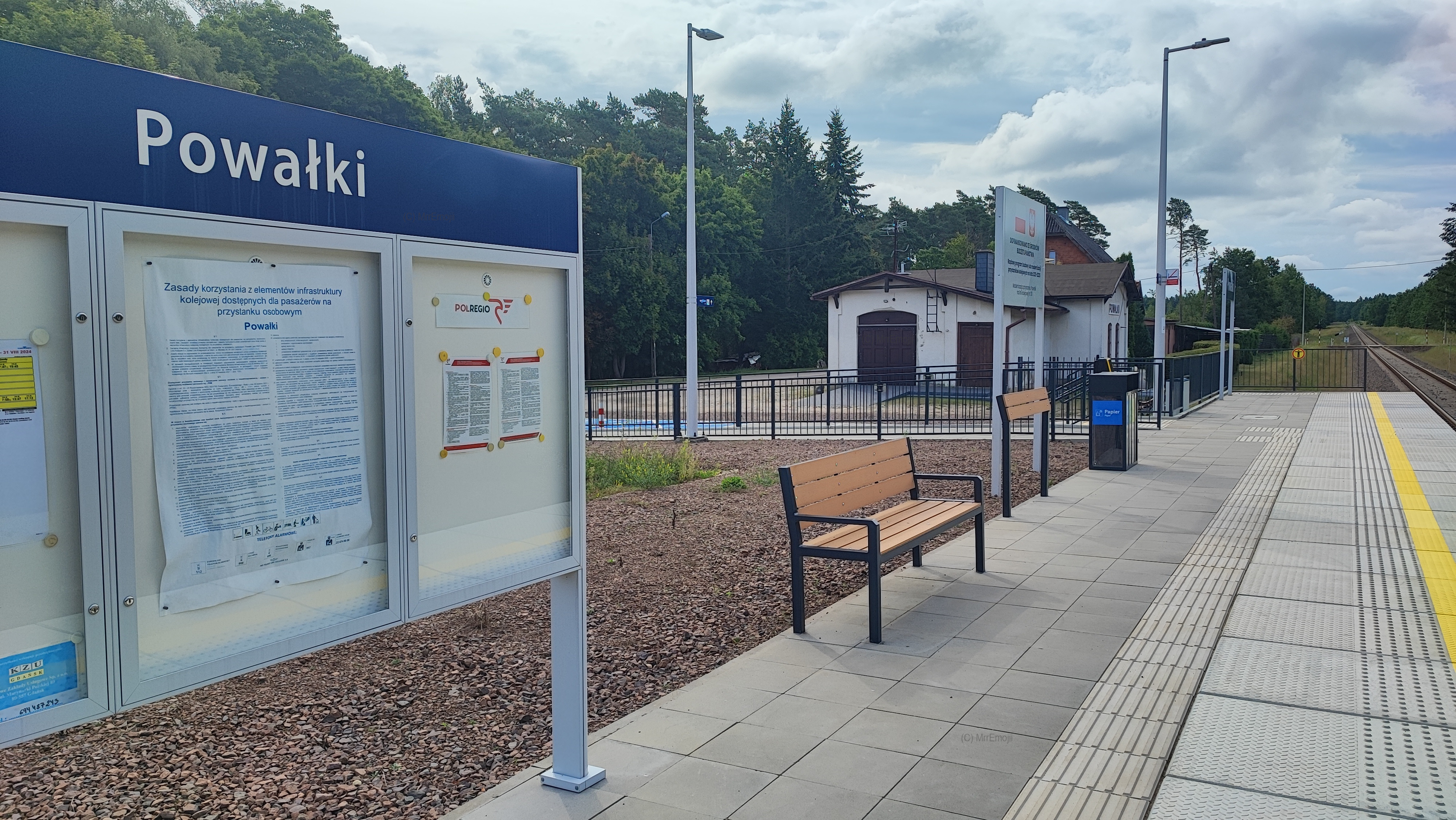

Powałki is a PKP railway station in Powałki (Pomeranian Voivodeship), Poland.

== Lines crossing the station ==
Start station	End station	Line type
Chojnice	Kościerzyna	Passenger/Freight

== Train services ==
The station is served by the following services:

- Regional services (R) Chojnice - Brusy - Lipusz - Koscierzyna
