= Radun =

Radun may refer to:

- Radun, Belarus
- Raduň, Czech Republic
- Raduń, Pomeranian Voivodeship, Poland
  - Raduń railway station
- Raduń, Choszczno County, West Pomeranian Voivodeship, Poland
- Raduń, Gryfice County, West Pomeranian Voivodeship, Poland
- Raduń, Gryfino County, West Pomeranian Voivodeship, Poland

== See also ==
- Piz Radun, a Swiss mountain
- Raduń Yeshiva originally in Raduń, Poland (now in Belarus)
