= Rytel Wieś railway station =

Railway station in Rytel, Poland

Coordinates: 53.7603°N 17.7722°E

Rytel Wieś
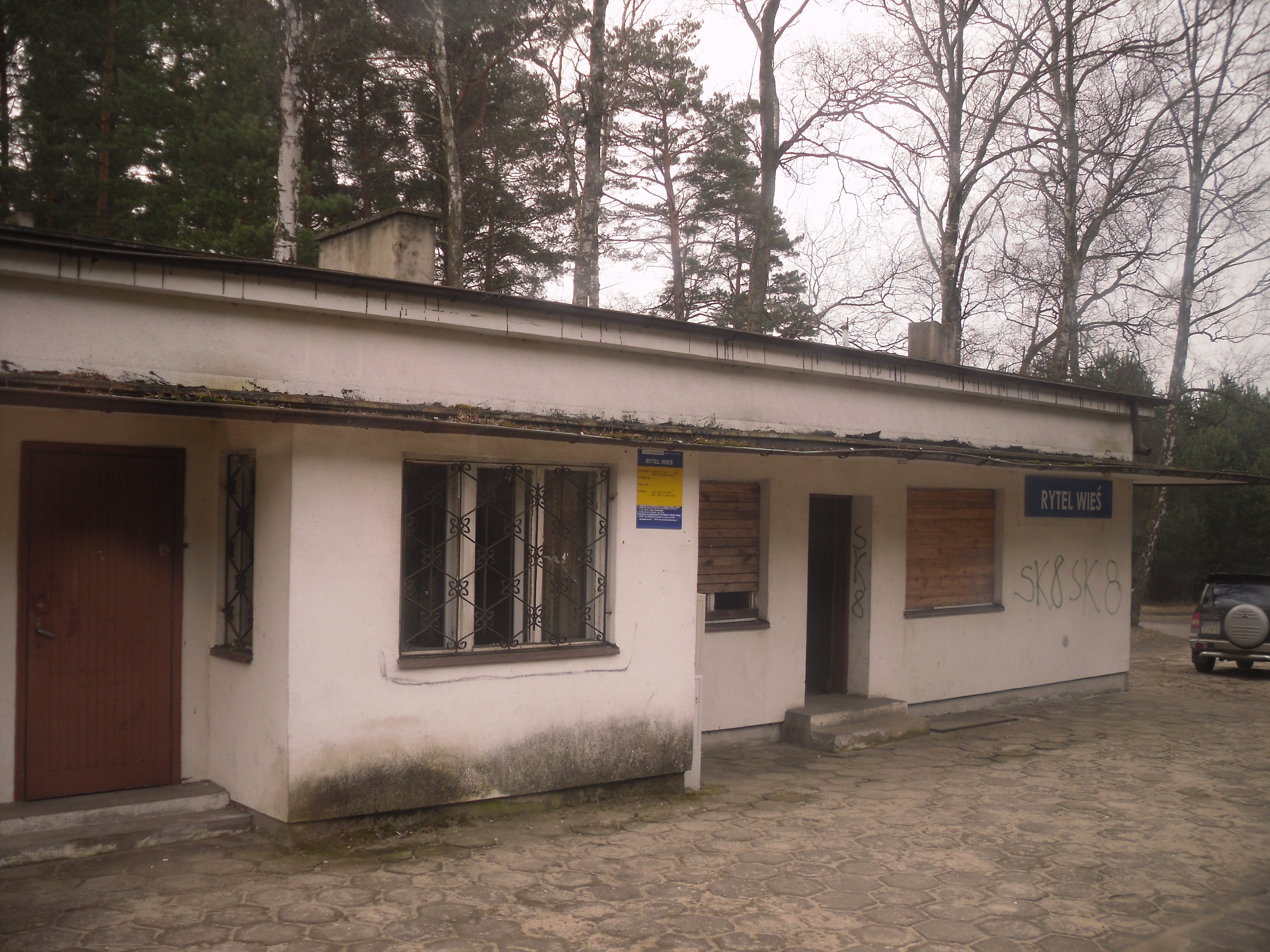

General information
- Location: Rytel; Poland
- Owner: Polskie Koleje Państwowe S.A.
- Line: 203: Tczew–Kostrzyn railway

Construction
- Structure type: Building: Yes; Depot: Never existed Water tower: Never existed

Services
Preceding station	Polregio	Following station
Gutowiec towards Tczew	PR	Rytel towards Chojnice
Czersk towards Gdynia Główna	PR	Chojnice Terminus
Location

Rytel Wieś is a PKP railway station in Rytel (Pomeranian Voivodeship), Poland.

== Lines crossing the station ==
Start station	End station	Line type
Tczew	Küstrin-Kietz	Passenger/Freight

== Train services ==
The station is served by the following service(s):

- Regional services (R) Chojnice - Czarna Woda - Starogard Gdanski - Tczew
- Regional services (R) Chojnice — Tczew — Gdynia Główna
