= Raduń railway station =

Railway station in Pomeranian Voivodeship, Poland

Coordinates: 53°58′09″N 17°46′43″E

Raduń
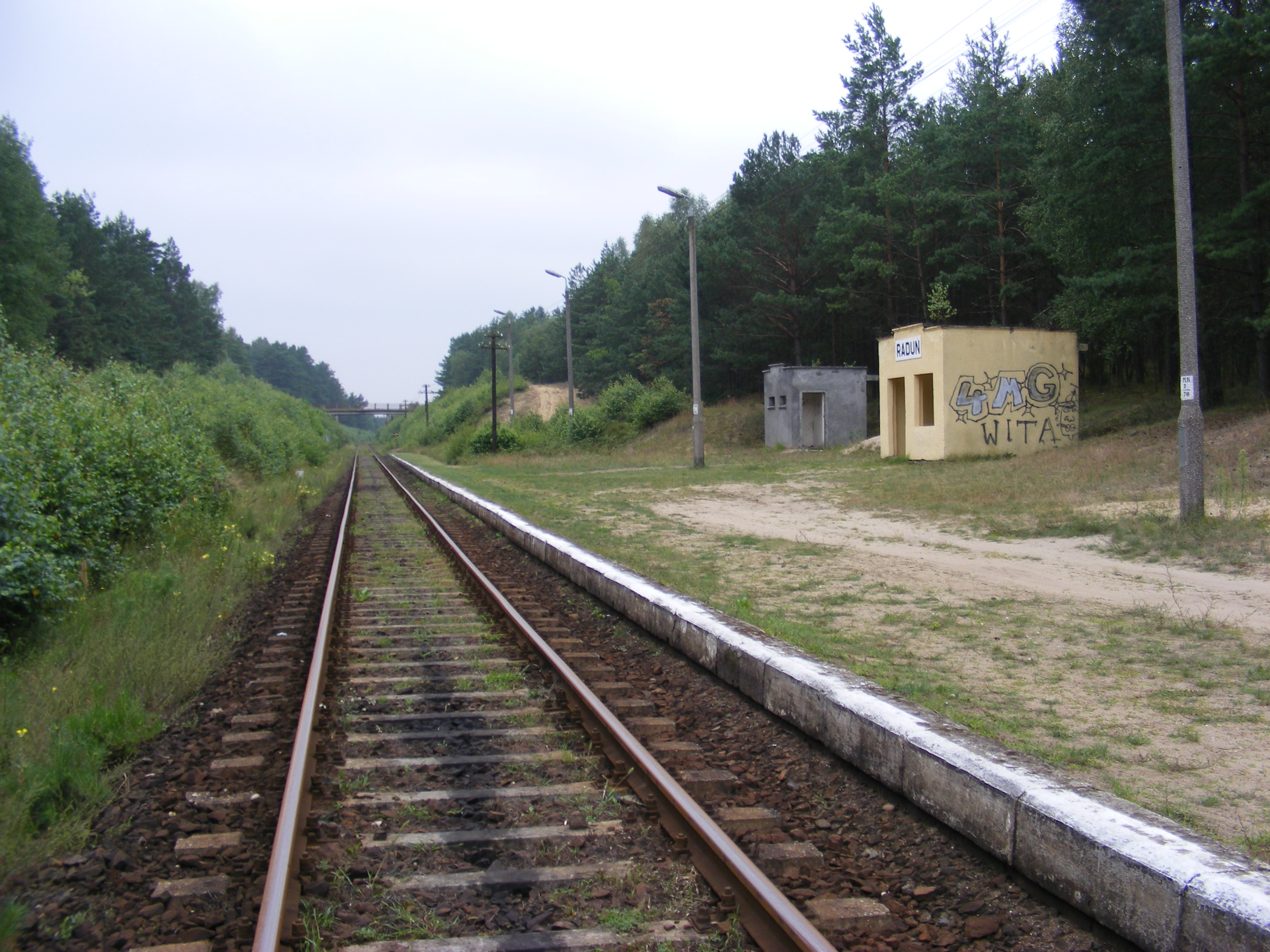

General information
- Location: Raduń; Poland
- Owner: Polskie Koleje Państwowe S.A.
- Line: 211: Chojnice–Kościerzyna railway

Construction
- Structure type: Building: Never existed Depot: Never existed Water tower: Never existed

History
- Former names: Raduhn (Kr. Berent) until 1945

Services
Preceding station	Polregio	Following station
Lubnia towards Chojnice	PR	Dziemiany Kaszubskie towards Kościerzyna
Location

Raduń is a PKP railway station in Raduń (Pomeranian Voivodeship), Poland.

== Lines crossing the station ==
Start station	End station	Line type
Chojnice	Kościerzyna	Passenger/Freight

== Train services ==
The station is served by the following services:

- Regional services (R) Chojnice - Brusy - Lipusz - Koscierzyna
