= Żabno k. Chojnic railway station =

Railway station in Chojnice County, Poland

Coordinates: 53°51′20″N 17°42′28″E

Żabno k. Chojnic

General information
- Location: Żabno k. Chojnic; Poland
- Owner: Polskie Koleje Państwowe S.A.
- Line: 211: Chojnice–Kościerzyna railway

Construction
- Structure type: Building: Never existed Depot: Never existed Water tower: Never existed

History
- Former names: Heidewiese until 1945

Services
Preceding station	Polregio	Following station
Męcikał towards Chojnice	PR	Brusy towards Kościerzyna
Location

Żabno k. Chojnic is a PKP railway station in Żabno k. Chojnic (Pomeranian Voivodship), Poland.

== Lines crossing the station ==
Start station	End station	Line type
Chojnice	Kościerzyna	Passenger/Freight

== Train services ==
The station is served by the following services:

- Regional services (R) Chojnice - Brusy - Lipusz - Koscierzyna
