= Brusy railway station =

Railway station in Brusy, Poland

Coordinates: 53°52′56.8″N 17°43′40.01″E

Brusy
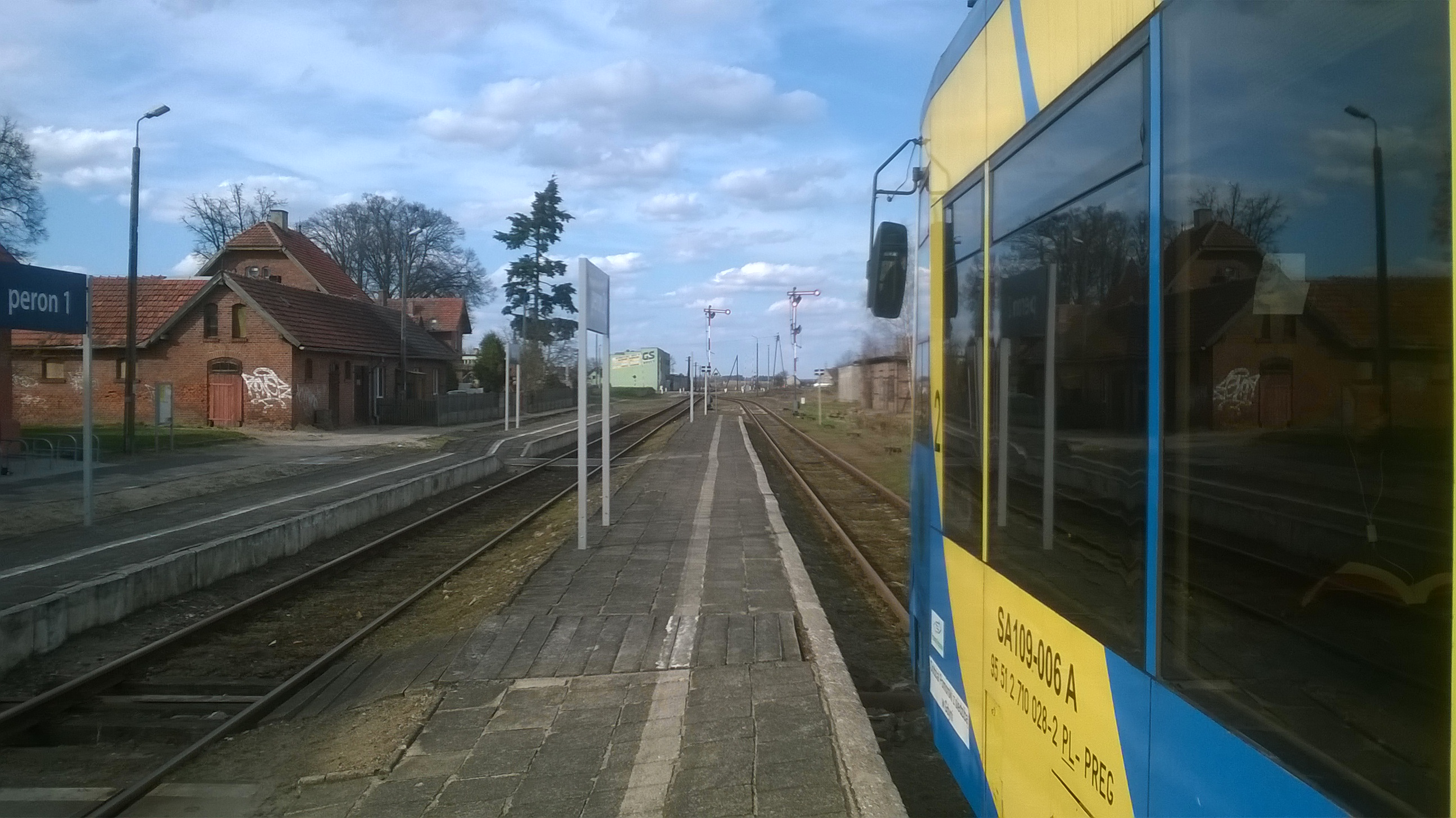

General information
- Location: Brusy, Pomeranian Voivodeship; Poland
- Owner: Polish State Railways
- Line: Chojnice–Kościerzyna
- Platforms: 2

Construction
- Structure type: Building: Yes; Depot: Never existed Water tower: Never existed

History
- Former names: Bruß (before 1945)

Services
Preceding station	Polregio	Following station
Żabno k. Chojnic towards Chojnice	PR	Lubnia towards Kościerzyna
Location
- Location within Poland Location within Pomeranian Voivodeship

Brusy is a railway station in Brusy, Chojnice County within the Pomeranian Voivodeship in northern Poland.

== Lines ==
Start station	End station	Traffic
Chojnice	Kościerzyna	Passenger/Freight

== Train services ==
The station is served by the following services:

- Regional services (PR) Chojnice - Brusy - Lipusz - Koscierzyna
