= Dziemiany Kaszubskie railway station =

Railway station in Dziemiany, Poland

Coordinates: 54°00′40″N 17°46′30″E

Dziemiany Kaszubskie
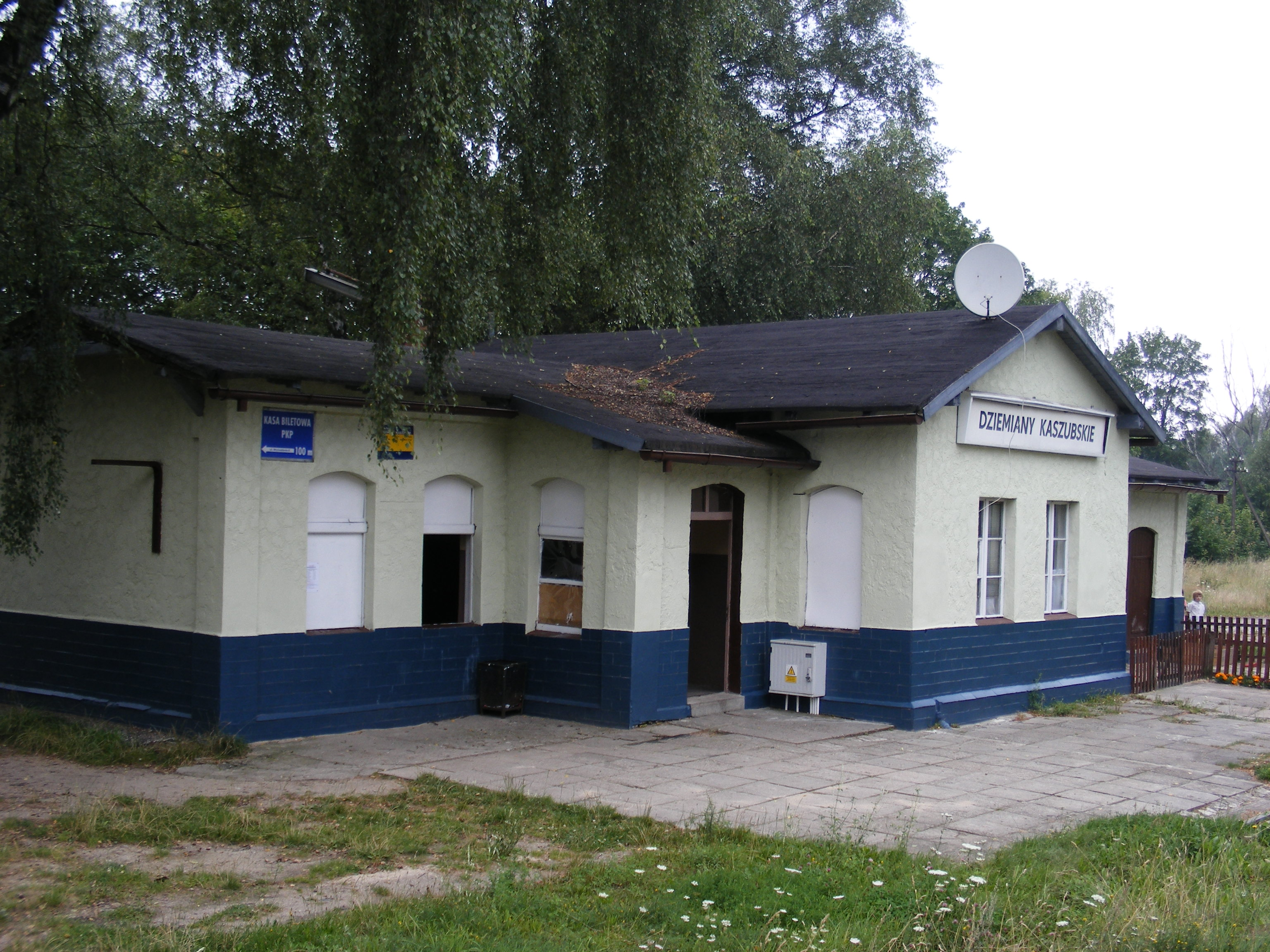

General information
- Location: Dziemiany Kaszubskie; Poland
- Owner: Polskie Koleje Państwowe S.A.
- Line: 211: Chojnice–Kościerzyna railway
- Platforms: 2

Construction
- Structure type: Building: Yes; Depot: Never existed Water tower: Never existed

History
- Former names: Sophienwalde (Westpreußen) until 1945

Services
Preceding station	Polregio	Following station
Raduń towards Chojnice	PR	Kalisz Kaszubski towards Kościerzyna
Location

Dziemiany Kaszubskie is a PKP railway station in Dziemiany Kaszubskie (Pomeranian Voivodeship), Poland.

== Lines crossing the station ==
Start station	End station	Line type
Chojnice	Kościerzyna	Passenger/Freight

== Train services ==
The station is served by the following services:

- Regional services (R) Chojnice - Brusy - Lipusz - Koscierzyna
