= Czersk railway station =

Railway station in Czersk, Poland

Coordinates: 53°48′03″N 17°58′20″E

Czersk
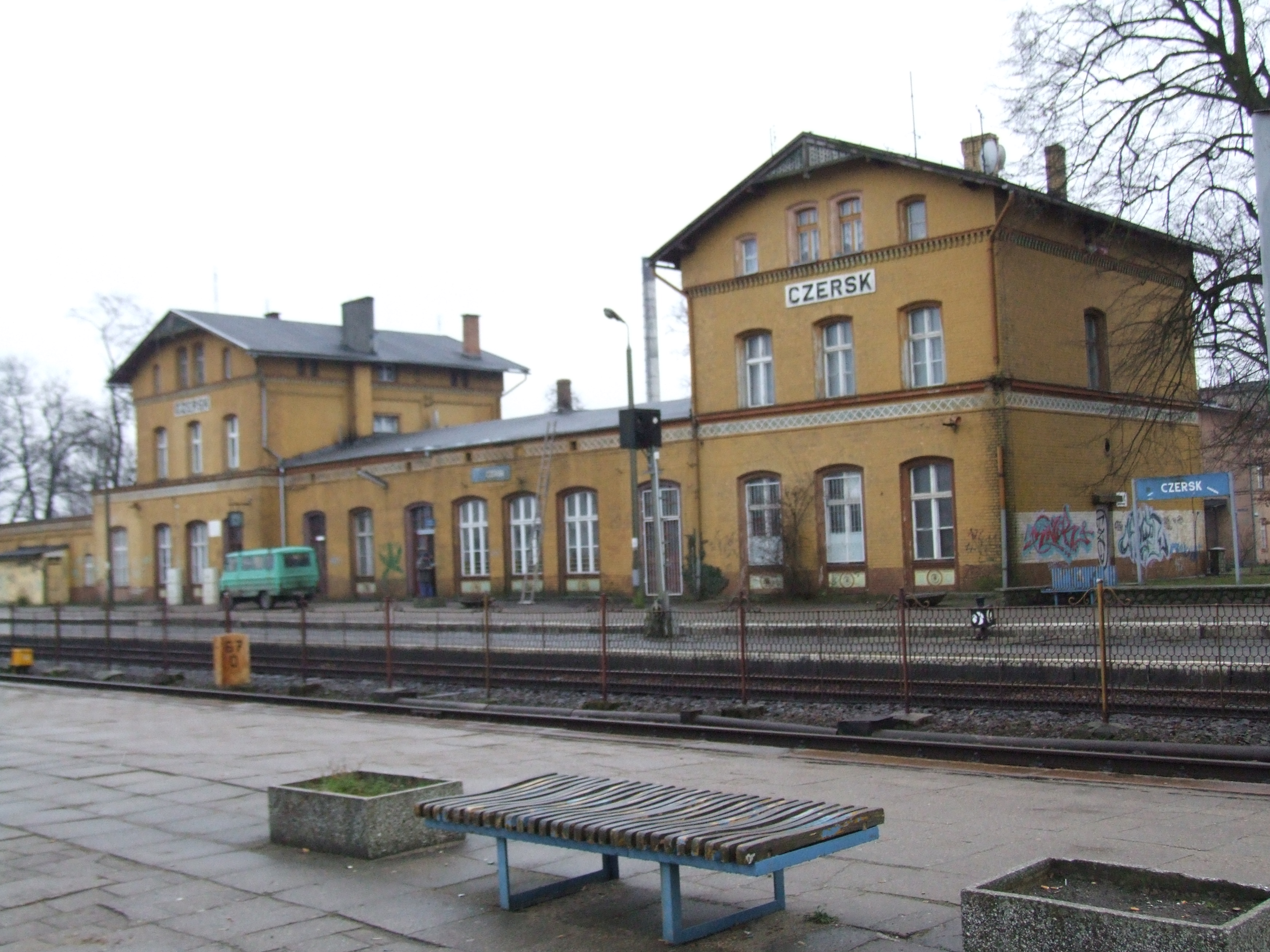

General information
- Location: Czersk; Poland
- Owner: Polskie Koleje Państwowe S.A.
- Lines: 203: Tczew–Kostrzyn railway 215: Będźmirowice–Karsin railway
- Platforms: 3

Construction
- Structure type: Building: Yes; Depot: Never existed Water tower: Yes

History
- Former names: Heiderode

Services
Preceding station	PKP Intercity	Following station
Łąg towards Gdynia Główna	TLK	Chojnice towards Kostrzyn
Preceding station	Polregio	Following station
Łąg towards Tczew	PR	Gutowiec towards Chojnice
Łąg towards Gdynia Główna	PR	Rytel Wieś towards Chojnice
Location

Czersk is a Polish State Railways (PKP) station in Czersk (Pomeranian Voivodeship), Poland.

== Lines crossing the station ==
Start station	End station	Line type
Laskowice Pomorskie	Bąk	Passenger/Freight
Tczew	Küstrin-Kietz	Passenger/Freight

== Train services ==
The station is served by the following service(s):

- Intercity services (TLK) Gdynia Główna — Kostrzyn
- Regional services (R) Chojnice - Czarna Woda - Starogard Gdanski - Tczew
- Regional services (R) Chojnice — Tczew — Gdynia Główna
