= Moszczenica Pomorska railway station =

Railway station in Pomeranian Voivodeship, Poland

Coordinates: 53°38′31″N 17°29′16″E

Moszczenica Pomorska
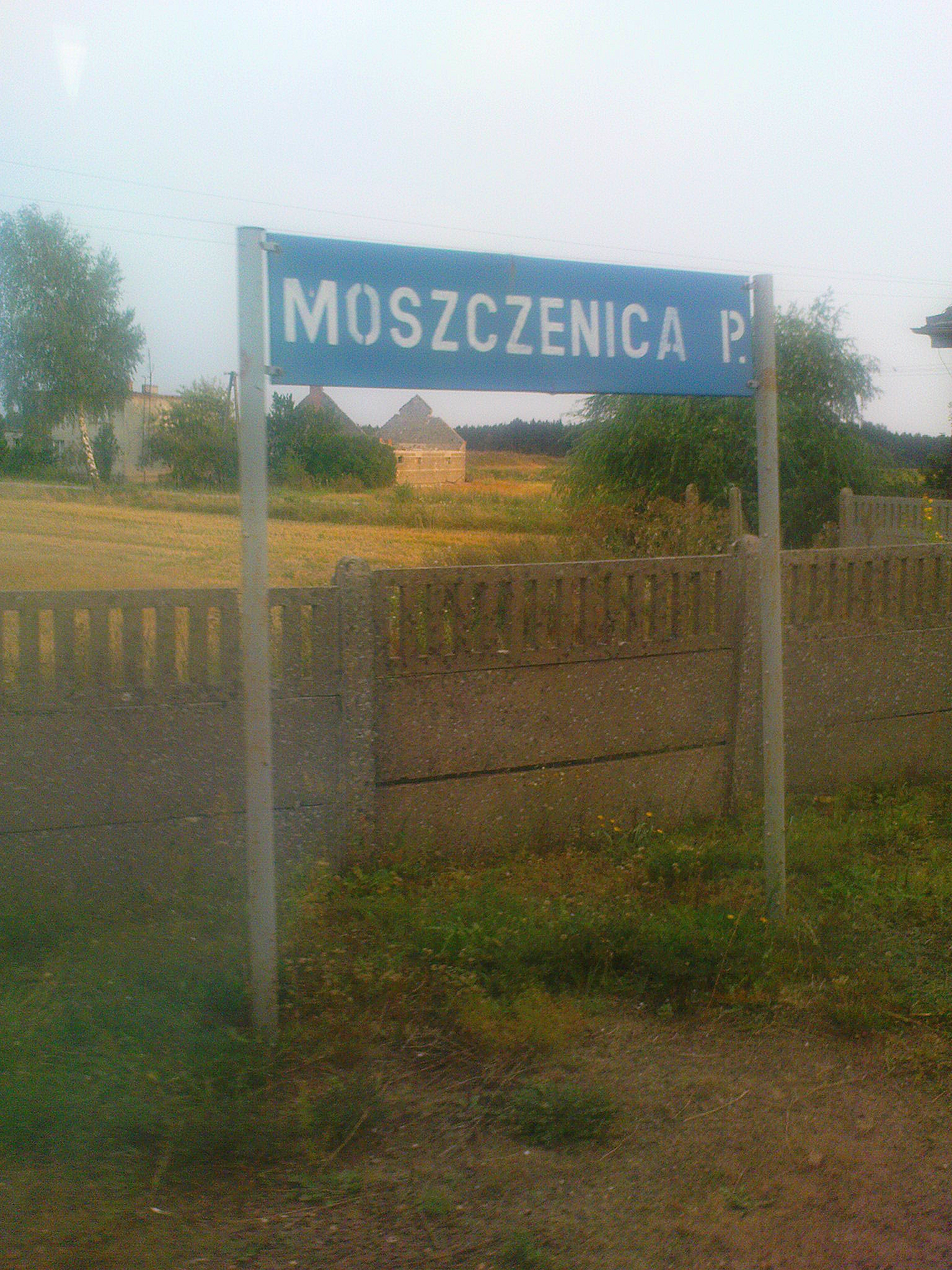

General information
- Location: Moszczenica Pomorska; Poland
- Owner: Polskie Koleje Państwowe S.A.
- Platforms: 1

Construction
- Structure type: Building: Yes (no longer used); Depot: Never existed Water tower: Never existed

History
- Former names: Mosnitz
Location

Moszczenica Pomorska is a PKP railway station in Moszczenica, Pomeranian Voivodeship, Poland.

== Lines crossing the station ==
Start station	End station	Line type
Tczew	Küstrin-Kietz	Passenger/Freight
