= Krëban =

Krëban or Krëbans may refer to:

- Krëbans (Kashubian: Krëbanë, Polish: Krubanie), an ethnic subgroup of Kashubians
- Krëbane ("Krebans"), a Kashubian folkloric ensemble and a socio-cultural association with the same name
- Krëban z Milachòwa, pen name of Stanisław Pestka
