= Lębork Dretowo railway station =

Railway station in Lębork, Poland

Coordinates: 54.5214°N 17.7700°E

Lębork Dretowo
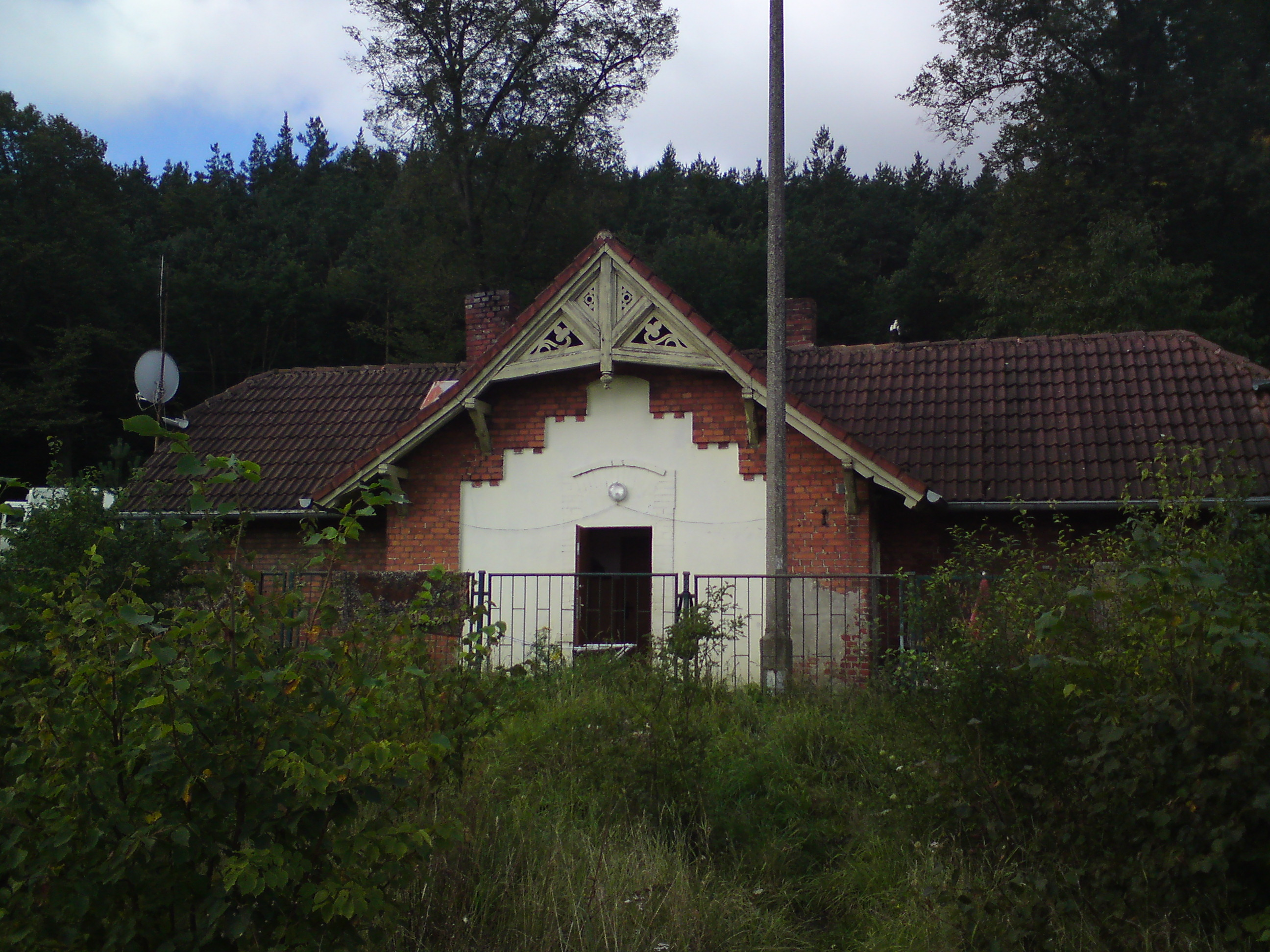

General information
- Location: Lębork; Poland
- Owner: Polskie Koleje Państwowe S.A.

Construction
- Structure type: Building: Yes (no longer used); Depot: Never existed Water tower: Never existed

History
- Former names: Finkenbruch until 1945
Location

Lębork Dretowo is a non-operational PKP railway station in Lębork (Pomeranian Voivodeship), Poland.

== Lines crossing the station ==
Start station	End station	Line type
Lębork	Bytów	Closed
