= Łubiana railway station =

Railway station in Łubiana, Poland

Łubiana

General information
- Location: Łubiana; Poland
- Coordinates: 54.114667°N 17.866994°E
- Owner: Polskie Koleje Państwowe S.A.
- Line: 211: Chojnice–Kościerzyna railway
- Platforms: 3

Construction
- Structure type: Building: Yes (no longer used); Depot: Never existed Water tower: Never existed

History
- Former names: Kleseldorf until 1945

Services
| Preceding station | Polregio | Following station |
|---|---|---|
| Lipusz towards Chojnice | PR | Kościerzyna Terminus |
Location

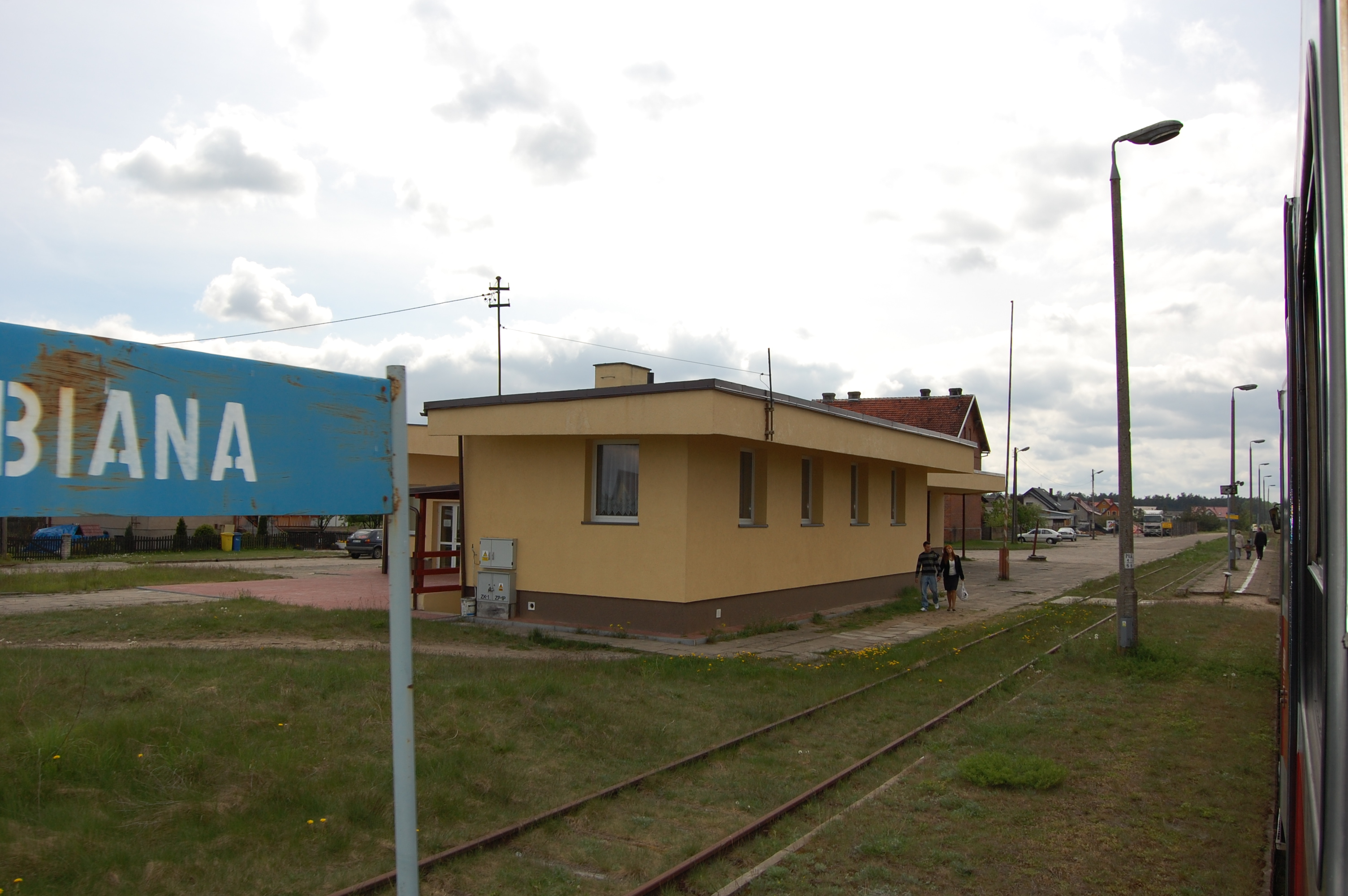
Train station Łubiana

Łubiana is a PKP railway station in Łubiana (Pomeranian Voivodeship), Poland.

== Lines crossing the station ==
| Start station | End station | Line type |
|---|---|---|
| Chojnice | Kościerzyna | Passenger/Freight |

== Train services ==
The station is served by the following services:

- Regional services (R) Chojnice - Brusy - Lipusz - Koscierzyna
