= Lipusz railway station =

Railway station in Lipusz, Poland

Lipusz
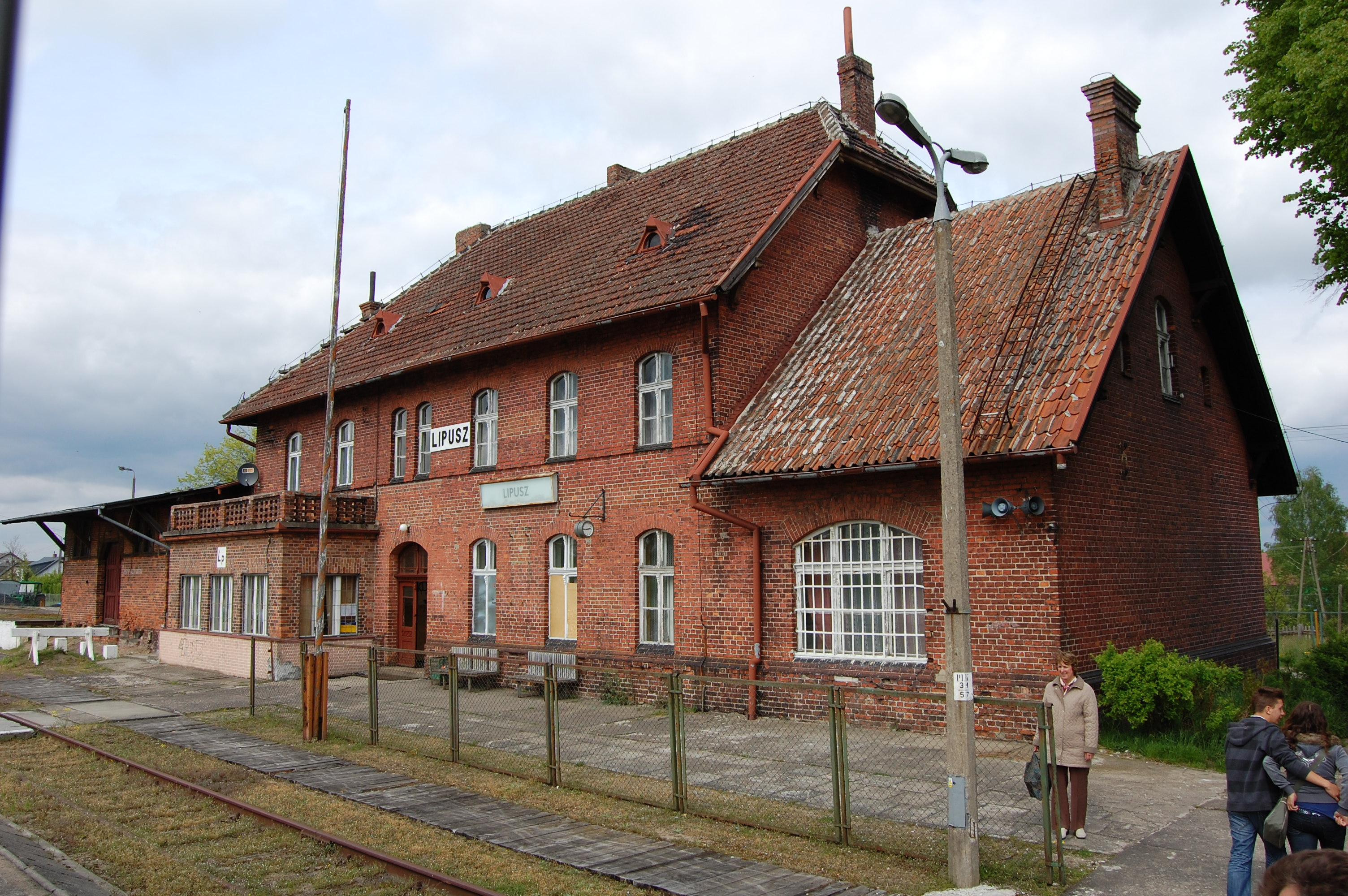
- The station in 2009

General information
- Location: Lipusz, Pomeranian Voivodeship; Poland
- Owner: Polish State Railways
- Lines: Chojnice–Kościerzyna; Lipusz–Róg
- Platforms: 2

History
- Former names: Lippusch (before 1945)

Services
Preceding station	Polregio	Following station
Lipuska Huta towards Chojnice	PR	Łubiana towards Kościerzyna
Location
- Location within Poland Location within Pomeranian Voivodeship

Lipusz is a railway station in Lipusz, Kościerzyna County, within the Pomeranian Voivodeship in northern Poland.

== Lines ==
Start station	End station	Traffic
Lipusz	Korzybie	Freight
Chojnice	Kościerzyna	Passenger and freight

== Train services ==
The station is served by the following services:

- Regional services (PR) Chojnice - Brusy - Lipusz - Koscierzyna
