= Brusy =

Town in Pomeranian Voivodeship, Poland

Brusy Brusë
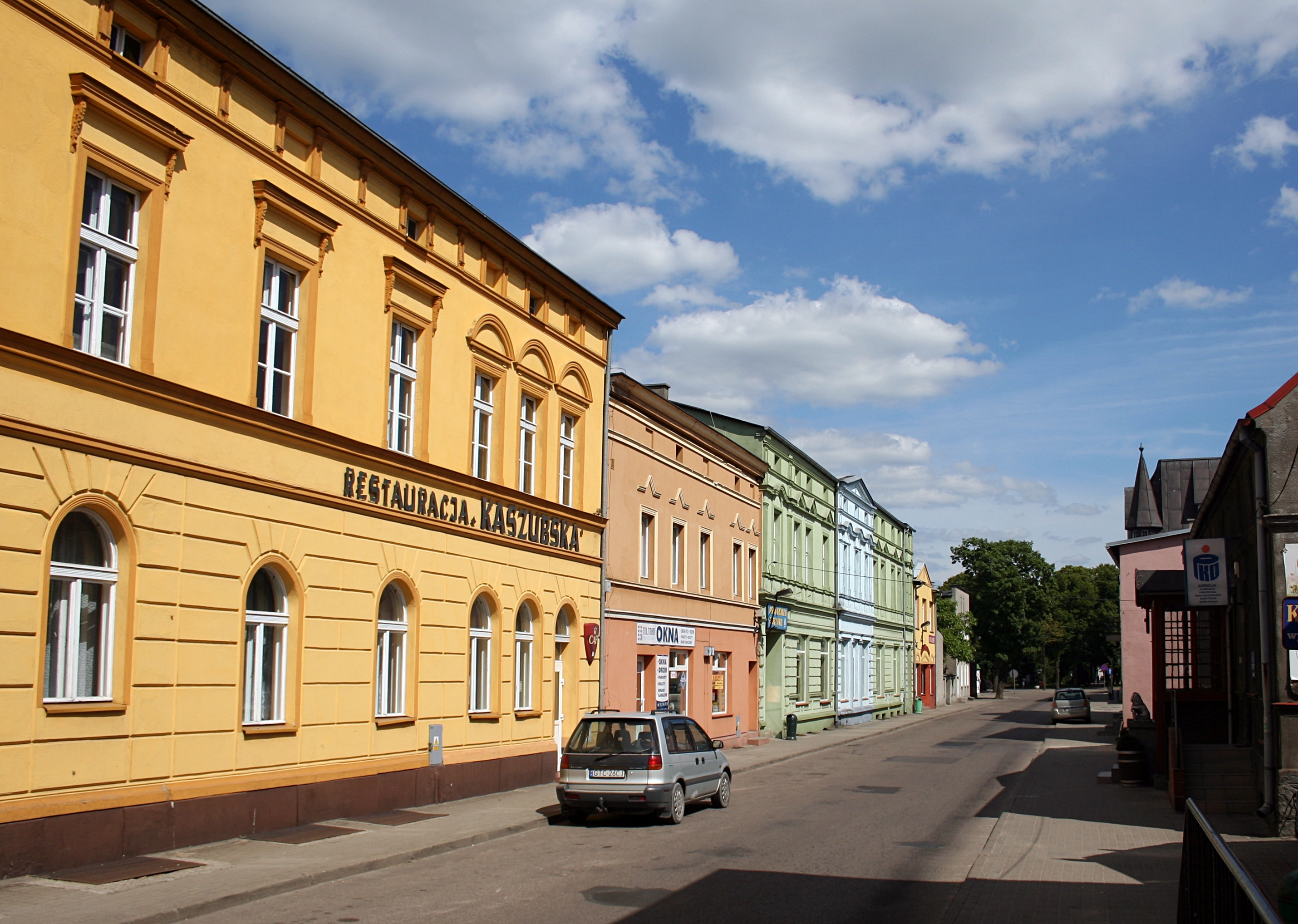

- Flag Coat of arms

- Location within Poland
- Coordinates: 53°53′8″N 17°43′19″E
- Country: Poland
- Voivodeship: Pomeranian
- County: Chojnice
- Gmina: Brusy
- Town rights: 1988

Government
  - Mayor: Witold Ossowski

Area
  - Total: 5.1 km^{2} (2.0 sq mi)

Population (30 June 2023)
  - Total: 5,103
  - Density: 1,000/km^{2} (2,600/sq mi)
- Time zone: UTC+1 (CET)
  - Summer (DST): UTC+2 (CEST)
- Postal code: 89-632
- Vehicle registration: GCH
- Website: http://brusy.pl/

Brusy [ˈbrusɨ] (Kashubian: Brusë; formerly German: Bruß) is a town in northern Poland, located in the Chojnice County in the Pomeranian Voivodeship. As of June 2023, the town has a population of 5,103.

== History ==
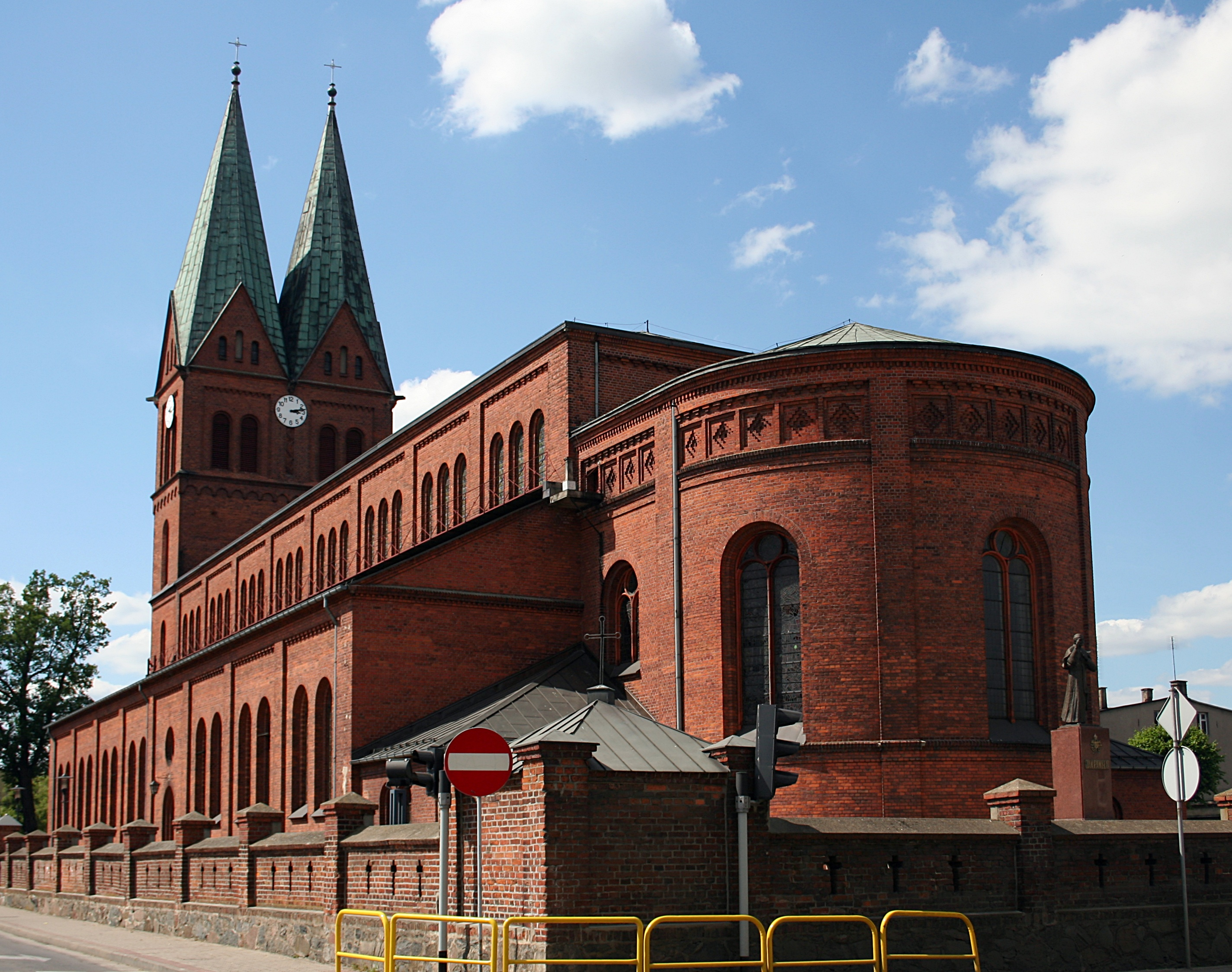
All Saints church

Brusy was a royal village of the Polish Crown, administratively located in the Tuchola County in the Pomeranian Voivodeship.

Since the 19th century Brusy was an important center of the Kashub movement, although a fair amount of Kashubians from Brusy emigrated to Winona, Minnesota in the late 1900s. In 2007, the ninth Congress of Kashubians was held here, and in 2012, the annual Kashubian Unity Day celebration was conducted here. A Kashubian secondary school is also located in the town.

In the interwar period, it was administratively located in the Chojnice County in the Pomeranian Voivodeship of Poland. According to the 1921 census, Brusy had a population of 2,260, 98.2% Polish.

During the German occupation of Poland (World War II), inhabitants of Brusy were among over 450 Poles massacred by the Germans in autumn of 1939 in the Igielska Valley. In November 1939 the SS, Gestapo and Selbstschutz murdered local Polish teachers in a large massacre of Polish teachers near Skarszewy. Further executions of local Poles were carried out in January 1940 in the Igielska Valley and in the fields near Chojnice. Several Poles, who were either born or lived and worked in Brusy, were murdered by the Russians in the Katyn massacre in 1940. In May 1942, the Germans expelled dozens of Poles, whose farms were handed over to Germans as part of the Lebensraum policy. The secret Polish resistance organization Pomeranian Griffin (Gryf Pomorski) operated in the Brusy area under the leadership of Colonel Józef Wrycza, who was also a Roman Catholic priest. In April 1944, the Polish resistance liberated several Polish prisoners from German custody. The Germans set up a Waffen-SS training ground in the vicinity, and located its administration in Brusy. Brusy was also the location of the Nazi German Bruss subcamp of the Stutthof concentration camp, in which around 500 female prisoners were held as forced labour.

It obtained town rights on 1 January 1988.

== Notable people ==
- Stanisław Lamczyk (born 1957), Polish politician, elected to the Sejm in 2005
- Piotr Piekarski (born 1964), retired Polish 800 metres runner, participated in the 1992 Summer Olympics
- Jan Wyrowiński (born 1947), Polish politician and Kashubian activist

== See also ==
- Brusy (PKP station)
- Krëbane
