= Stanisław Lamczyk =

Polish politician (born 1957)

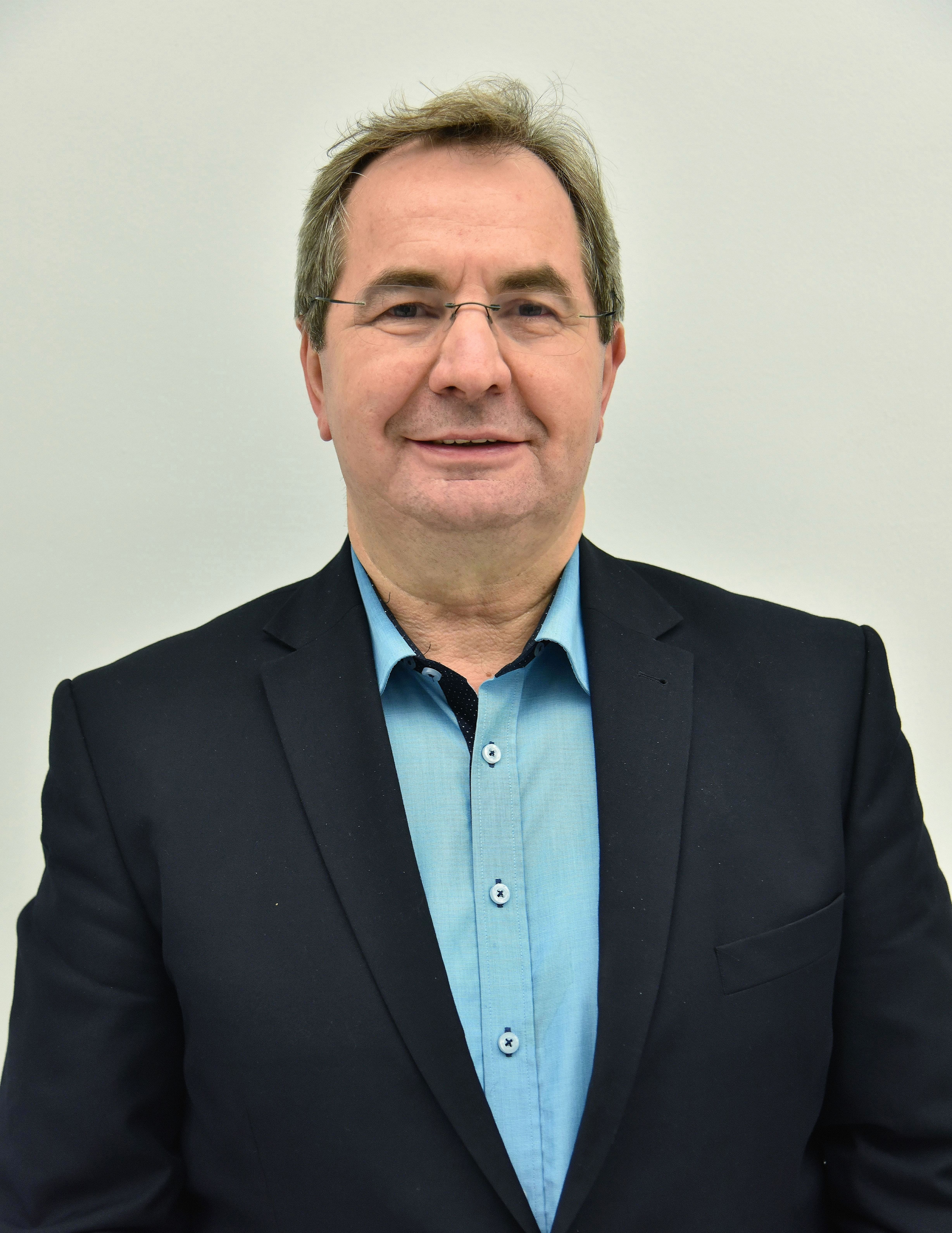

Member of Sejm
- Incumbent
- Assumed office 12 November 2023
- In office 25 September 2005 – 12 November 2015

Member of Senate
- In office 12 November 2019 – 12 November 2023

Personal details
- Born: 12 August 1957 (age 68)
- Party: Civic Platform

Stanisław Józef Lamczyk (born 12 August 1957 in Brusy) is a Polish politician. He was elected to the Sejm on 25 September 2005, getting 6,276 votes in 26 Gdynia district as a candidate from the Civic Platform list.

== See also ==
- Members of Polish Sejm 2005-2007
