= Krojanty =

- Village
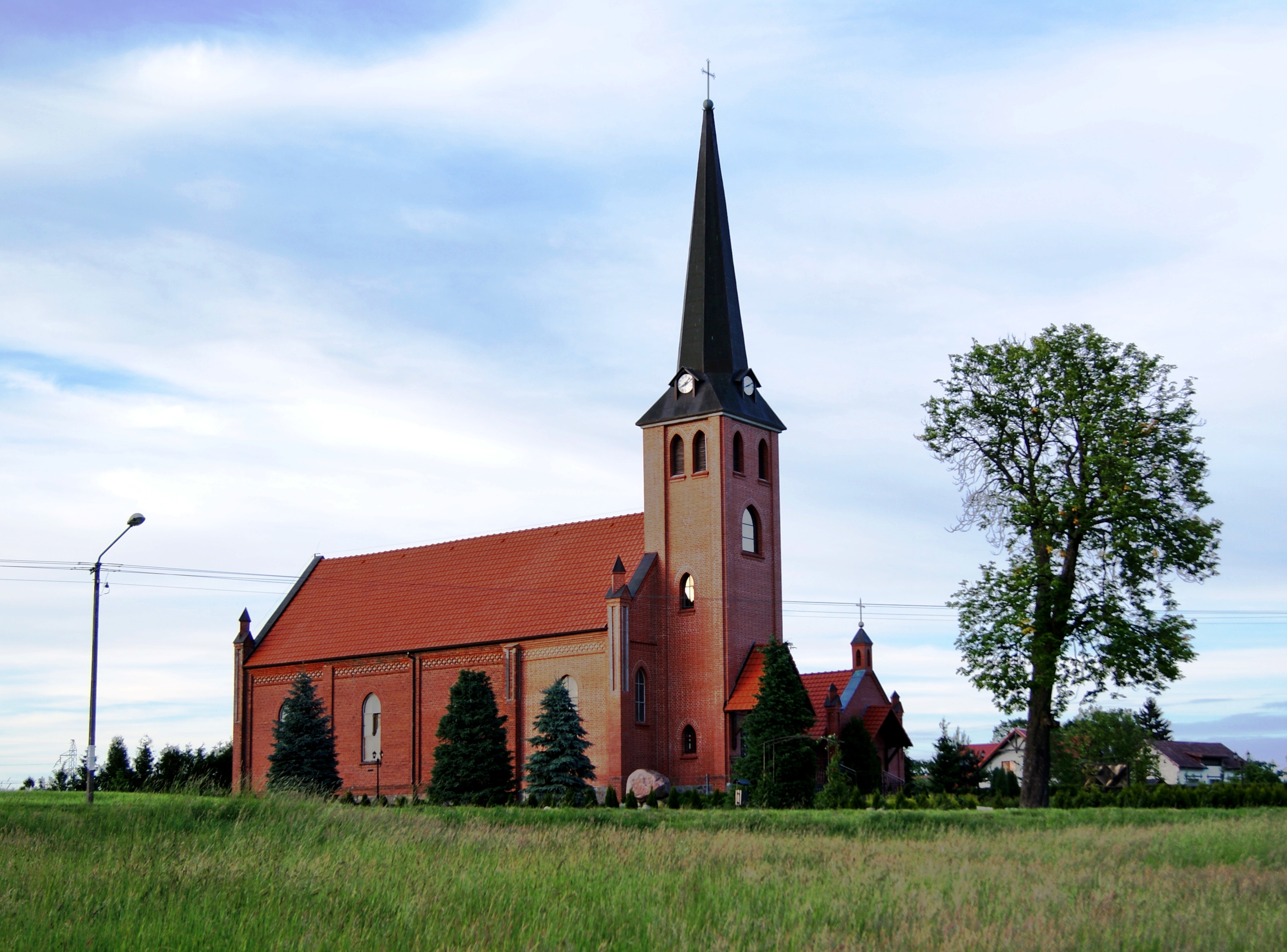
- Immaculate Conception church in Krojanty

- Location within Poland
- Coordinates: 53°43′32″N 17°37′55″E
- Country: Poland
- Voivodeship: Pomeranian
- County: Chojnice
- Gmina: Chojnice
- Population: 461
- Time zone: UTC+1 (CET)
  - Summer (DST): UTC+2 (CEST)
- Vehicle registration: GCH

Krojanty [krɔˈjantɨ] is a village in the administrative district of Gmina Chojnice, within Chojnice County, Pomeranian Voivodeship, in northern Poland.

== History ==
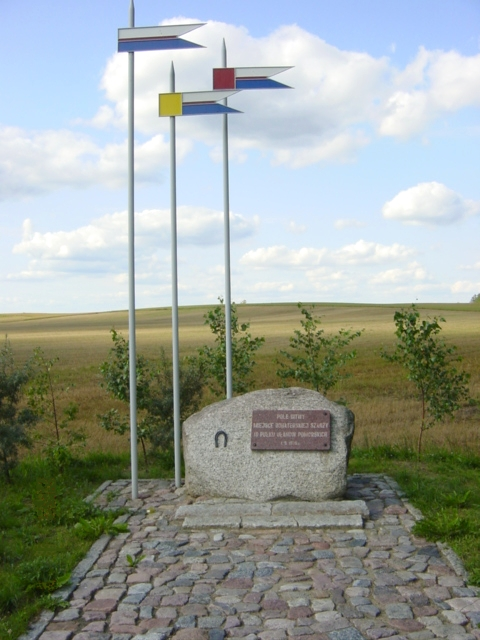
Monument at the battlefield

On 1 September 1939, the first day of the German invasion of Poland which started World War II, it was the site of the Skirmish of Krojanty which became an anti-Polish propaganda myth of Polish cavalry attacking German tanks.

During the subsequent German occupation, Krojanty was one of the sites of executions of Poles, carried out by the Germans in 1939 as part of the Intelligenzaktion. Local Poles were also among the victims of the massacres in the Igielska Valley near Chojnice, perpetrated by the Germans in October and November 1939, also as part of the Intelligenzaktion. In 1940, the German gendarmerie carried out expulsions of Poles, who were deported to the General Government in the more eastern part of German-occupied Poland, while their houses and farms were handed over to German colonists as part of the Lebensraum policy.

== Transport ==
There is a railway station in the village.
