= Krojanty railway station =

Railway station in Gmina Chojnice, Poland

Coordinates: 53.7303°N 17.6558°E

Krojanty

General information
- Location: Krojanty; Poland
- Owner: Polskie Koleje Państwowe S.A.
- Line: 203: Tczew–Kostrzyn railway

Construction
- Structure type: Building: Never existed Depot: Never existed Water tower: Never existed

Services
Preceding station	Polregio	Following station
Rytel towards Tczew	PR	Chojnice Terminus
Location

Krojanty is a PKP railway station in Krojanty (Pomeranian Voivodeship), Poland.

== Lines crossing the station ==
Start station	End station	Line type
Tczew	Küstrin Kietz	Passenger/Freight

== Train services ==
The station is served by the following service(s):

- Regional services (R) Chojnice - Czarna Woda - Starogard Gdanski - Tczew
