= Gutowiec =

- Village
- Location within Poland
- Coordinates: 53°46′15″N 17°51′18″E
- Country: Poland
- Voivodeship: Pomeranian
- County: Chojnice
- Gmina: Czersk
- Population: 371
- Time zone: UTC+1 (CET)
  - Summer (DST): UTC+2 (CEST)
- Vehicle registration: GCH

Gutowiec [ɡuˈtɔvjɛt͡s] is a village in the administrative district of Gmina Czersk, within Chojnice County, Pomeranian Voivodeship, in northern Poland. It is located within the Tuchola Forest in the historic region of Pomerania.

During the German occupation of Poland (World War II), in 1942, the Germans established a forced labour subcamp of the German military prison in Grudziądz.
