= Męcikał =

Village in Pomeranian Voivodeship, Poland

Męcikał Mãcëkôł
- Village
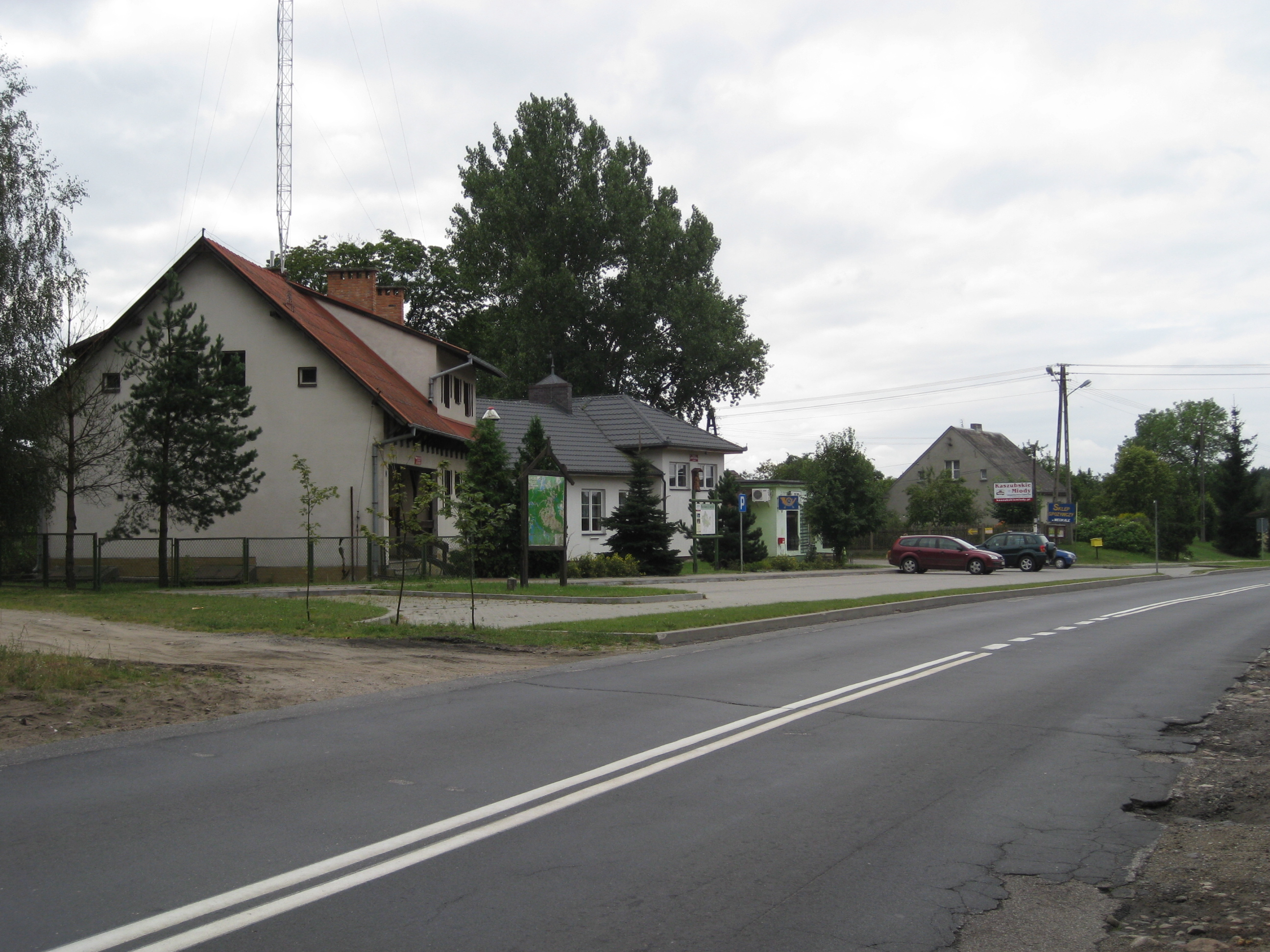

- Location within Poland
- Coordinates: 53°49′13″N 17°40′7″E
- Country: Poland
- Voivodeship: Pomeranian
- County: Chojnice
- Gmina: Brusy

Population
  - Total: 389
- Time zone: UTC+1 (CET)
  - Summer (DST): UTC+2 (CEST)
- Vehicle registration: GCH

Męcikał (Polish: [mɛnˈt͡ɕikau̯]; Kashubian: Mãcëkôł, German: Menzig) is a village in the administrative district of Gmina Brusy, within Chojnice County, Pomeranian Voivodeship, in northern Poland. It is located in the ethnocultural region of Kashubia in the historic region of Pomerania.
