= Bytów railway station =

Railway station in Bytów, Poland

Coordinates: 54°09′45″N 17°29′10″E

Bytów
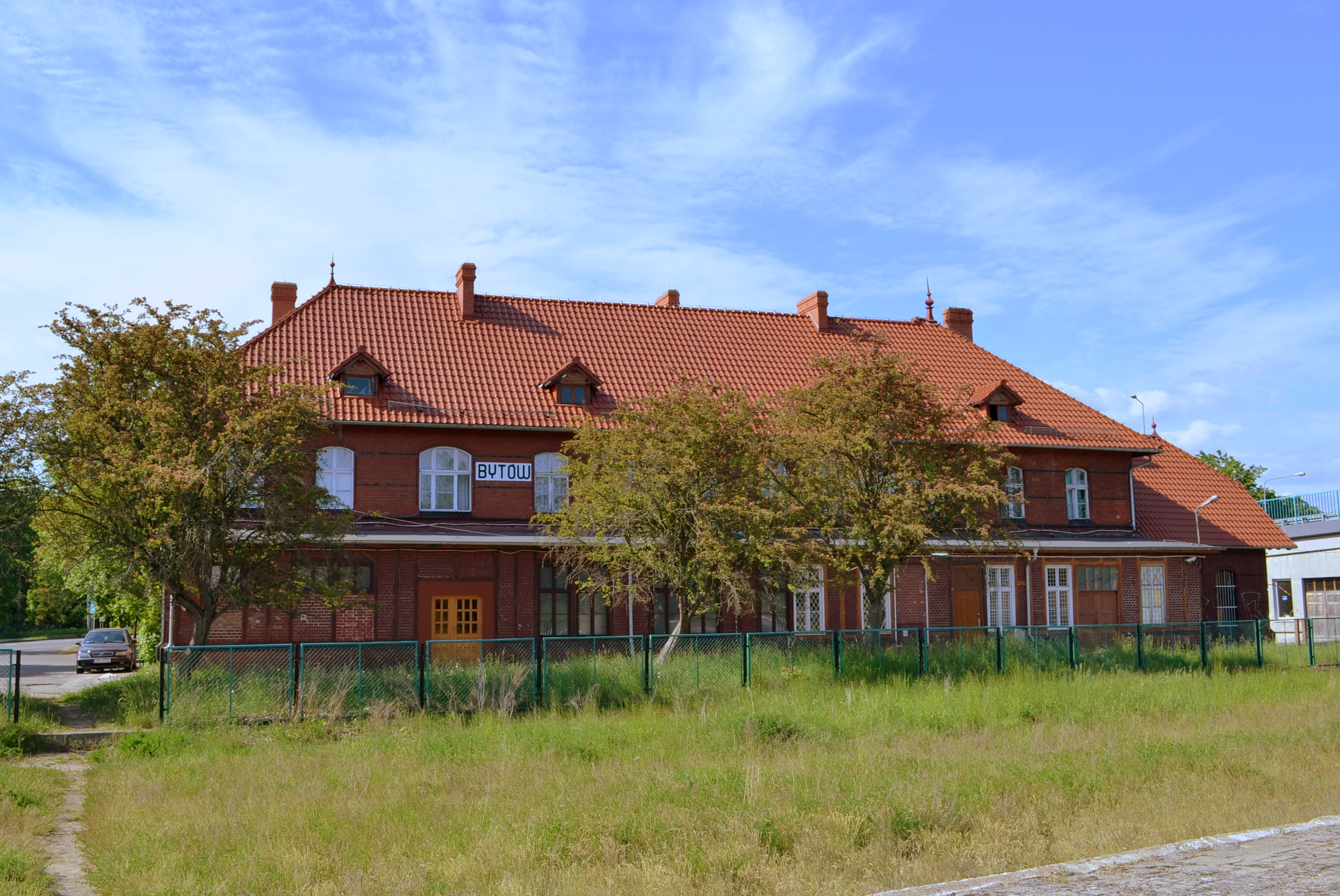

General information
- Location: Bytów; Poland
- Owner: Polskie Koleje Państwowe S.A.
- Platforms: 3

Construction
- Structure type: Building: Yes (no longer used); Depot: Pulled down Water tower: Pulled down

History
- Former names: Bütow until 1945
Location

Bytów is a PKP railway station in Bytów (Pomeranian Voivodeship), Poland.

== Lines crossing the station ==
Start station	End station	Line type
Bytów	Miastko	Closed
Lipusz	Korzybie	Freight/Closed
Lębork	Bytów	Closed
