= Moszczenica, Pomeranian Voivodeship =

Moszczenica
- Village
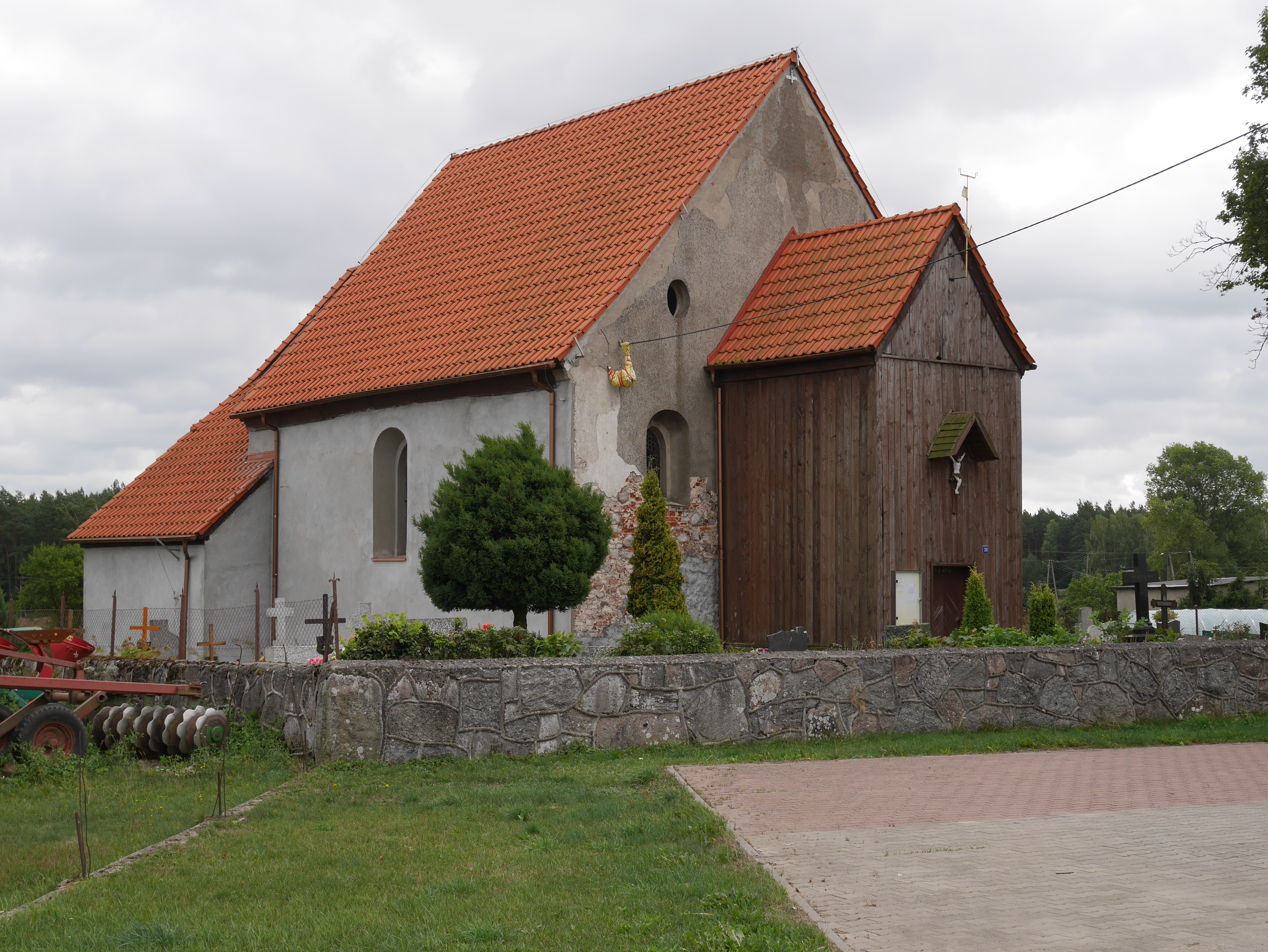
- Church of Saint Bartholomew

- Location within Poland
- Coordinates: 53°38′30″N 17°29′49″E
- Country: Poland
- Voivodeship: Pomeranian
- County: Chojnice
- Gmina: Chojnice

Population
  - Total: 186

Moszczenica [mɔʂt͡ʂɛˈnit͡sa] is a village in the administrative district of Gmina Chojnice, within Chojnice County, Pomeranian Voivodeship, in northern Poland.

For details of the history of the region, see History of Pomerania.
