= Krëbane =

Kashubian folkloric dance and music ensemble

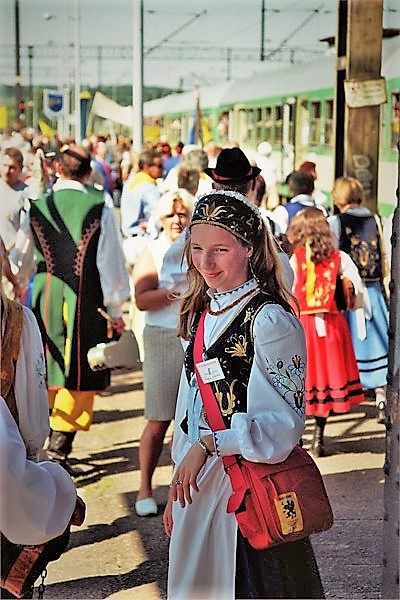
A girl in Kashubian folk dress

Krëbane (Krebans) is a Kashubian folkloric ensemble of dance and music based at Brusy, Poland. The full name: Polish: "Kaszubski Zespół Folklorystyczny "Krëbane" z Brus". It was established in 1980 by Władysław Czarnowski. The name Krëbane (i.e., Krëbans) refers to the local ethnic subgroup of Kashubians.

Since its establishment it received many awards, including established within the Kashubian culture, as well as bestowed by the Polish Ministers of Culture and Arts and of Education.

The ensemble consists of 8 age-based dance groups and 3 age-based capellas, to encompass artists from children to adults.

In 1995 the Socio-Cultural Association "Krëbane" was established around the ensemble, which includes the present and past members of the ensemble and their relatives. During the first 20 years of its existence, the ensemble enlisted over 1000 people. Eventually, the ensemble has become the largest multi-generation ethnographic ensemble in Kashubia.

In 2003, the founder and long-time leader of the ensemble, Władysław Czarnowski was awarded the Oskar Kolberg Prize "For Merits towards Folk Culture" (Polish: Za zasługi dla kultury ludowej).

In 2007 the ensemble spawned another one, "Bubliczki", led by Mateusz Czarnowski.

In 2010, during the festivities on the occasion of 30th anniversary of the ensemble several leading members were awarded state awards for their cultural achievements, including Silver Cross of Merit for Mirosława Czarnowska and Stanisław Teca, and Bronze Cross of Merit for Ewelina Styp Rekowska, Izabela Szyszka, and Wiesława Lubińska. The festivities were marred with the worries about the fate of the ensemble due to lack of state support and dropping interest: while in 2005 the ensemble listed 300 members, in 2010 there were only 70.

== Discography ==
- "Polish Folk Music Volume 17 - Kashubian Christmas Carols - Koledy - Zespol Krebane" - A CD with a selection of Christmas carols and pastorals from the Kashubia region. Recorded at Polish Radio Gdańsk on November 14, 1998.
  - Reissued in 2011
