= Lubnia =

Village in Pomeranian Voivodeship, Poland

Lubnia Lubniô
- Village
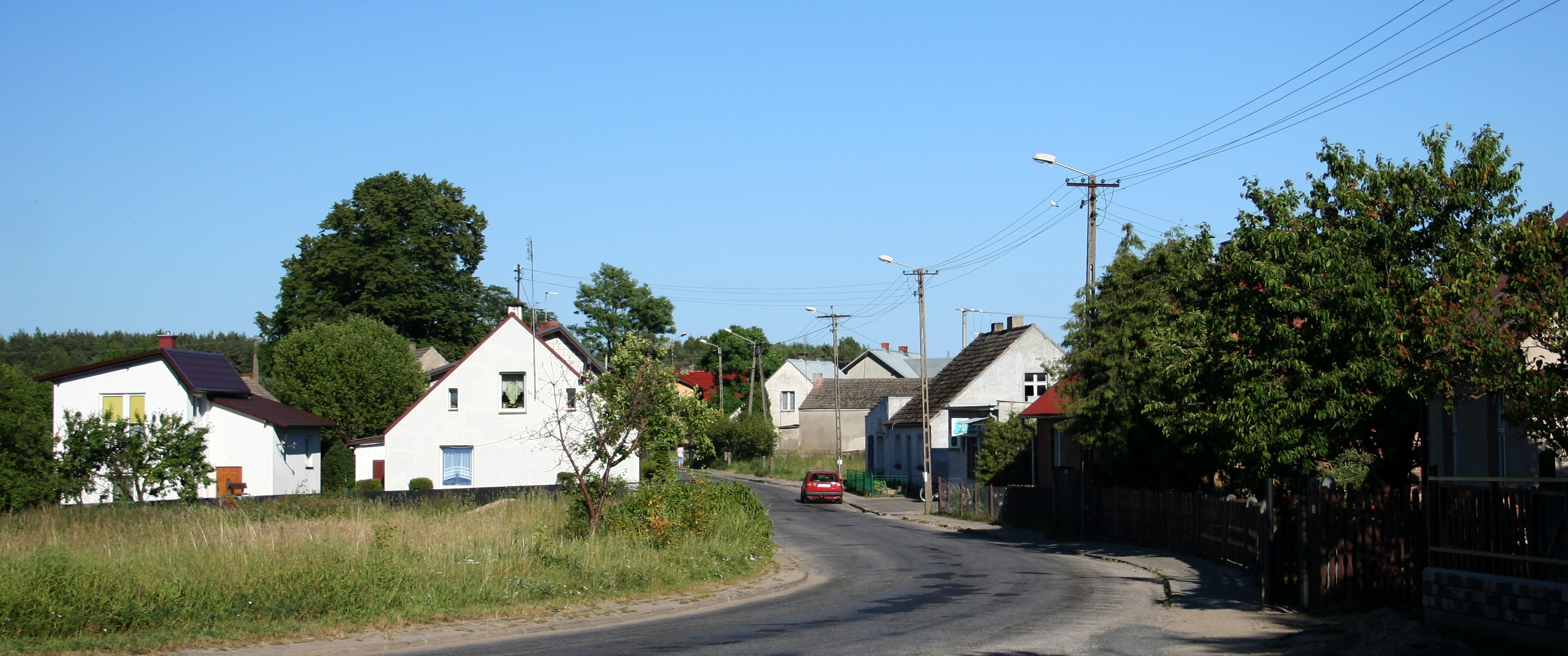

- Location within Poland
- Coordinates: 53°55′43″N 17°45′7″E
- Country: Poland
- Voivodeship: Pomeranian
- County: Chojnice
- Gmina: Brusy

Population
  - Total: 927
- Time zone: UTC+1 (CET)
  - Summer (DST): UTC+2 (CEST)
- Vehicle registration: GCH

Lubnia [ˈlubɲa] (Kashubian: Lubniô) is a village in the administrative district of Gmina Brusy, within Chojnice County, Pomeranian Voivodeship, in northern Poland. It is located in the ethnocultural region of Kashubia within the historic region of Pomerania.

Lubnia was a royal village of the Polish Crown, administratively located in the Tuchola County in the Pomeranian Voivodeship.
