= Rytel =

- Village
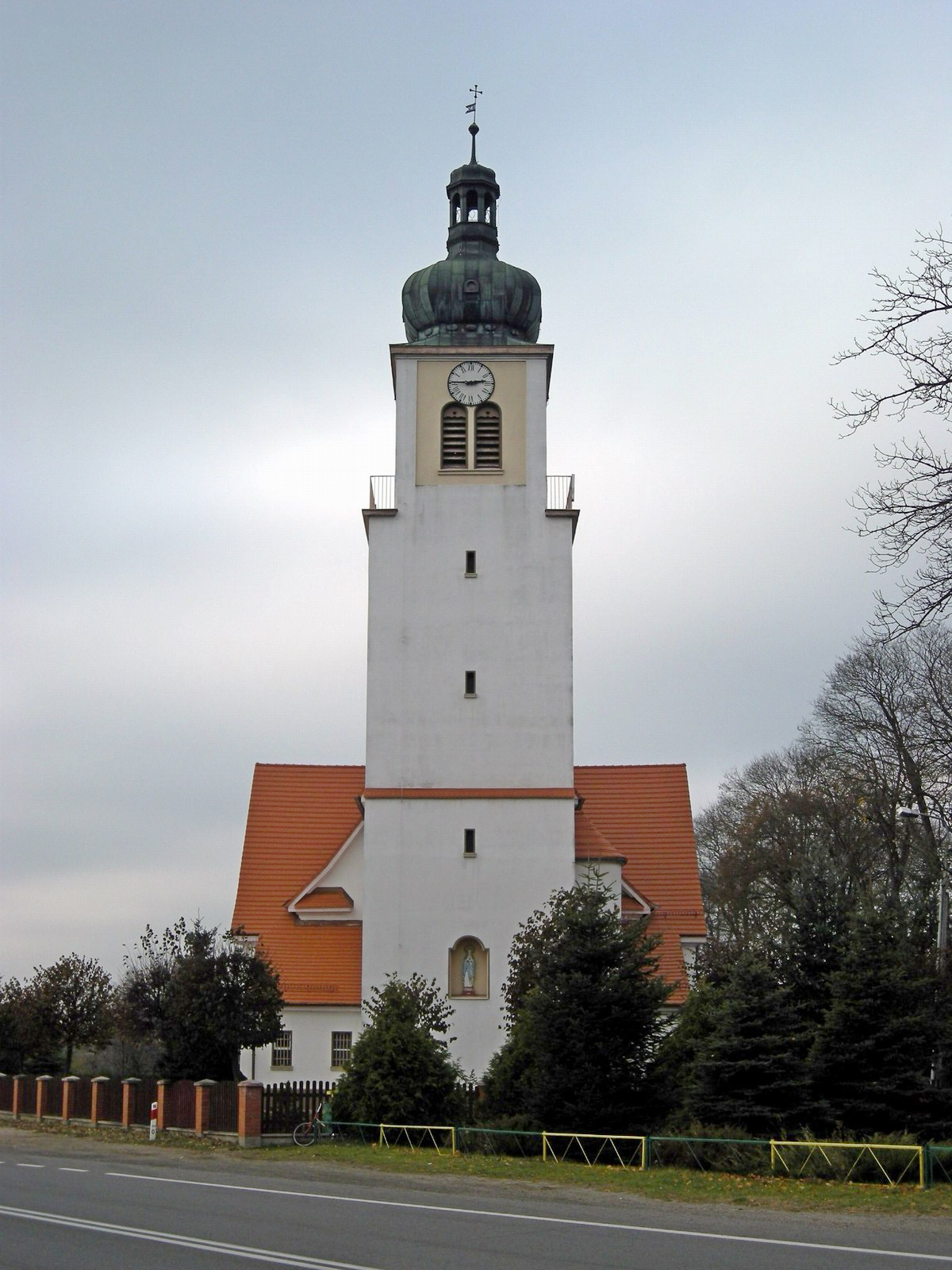
- Virgin Mary Queen of the Rosary church in Rytel

- Location within Poland
- Coordinates: 53°45′15″N 17°46′32″E
- Country: Poland
- Voivodeship: Pomeranian
- County: Chojnice
- Gmina: Czersk
- Population: 2,004
- Time zone: UTC+1 (CET)
  - Summer (DST): UTC+2 (CEST)
- Vehicle registration: GCH

Rytel [ˈrɨtɛl] is a village in the administrative district of Gmina Czersk, within Chojnice County, Pomeranian Voivodeship, in northern Poland. It is located within the historic region of Pomerania.

== History ==
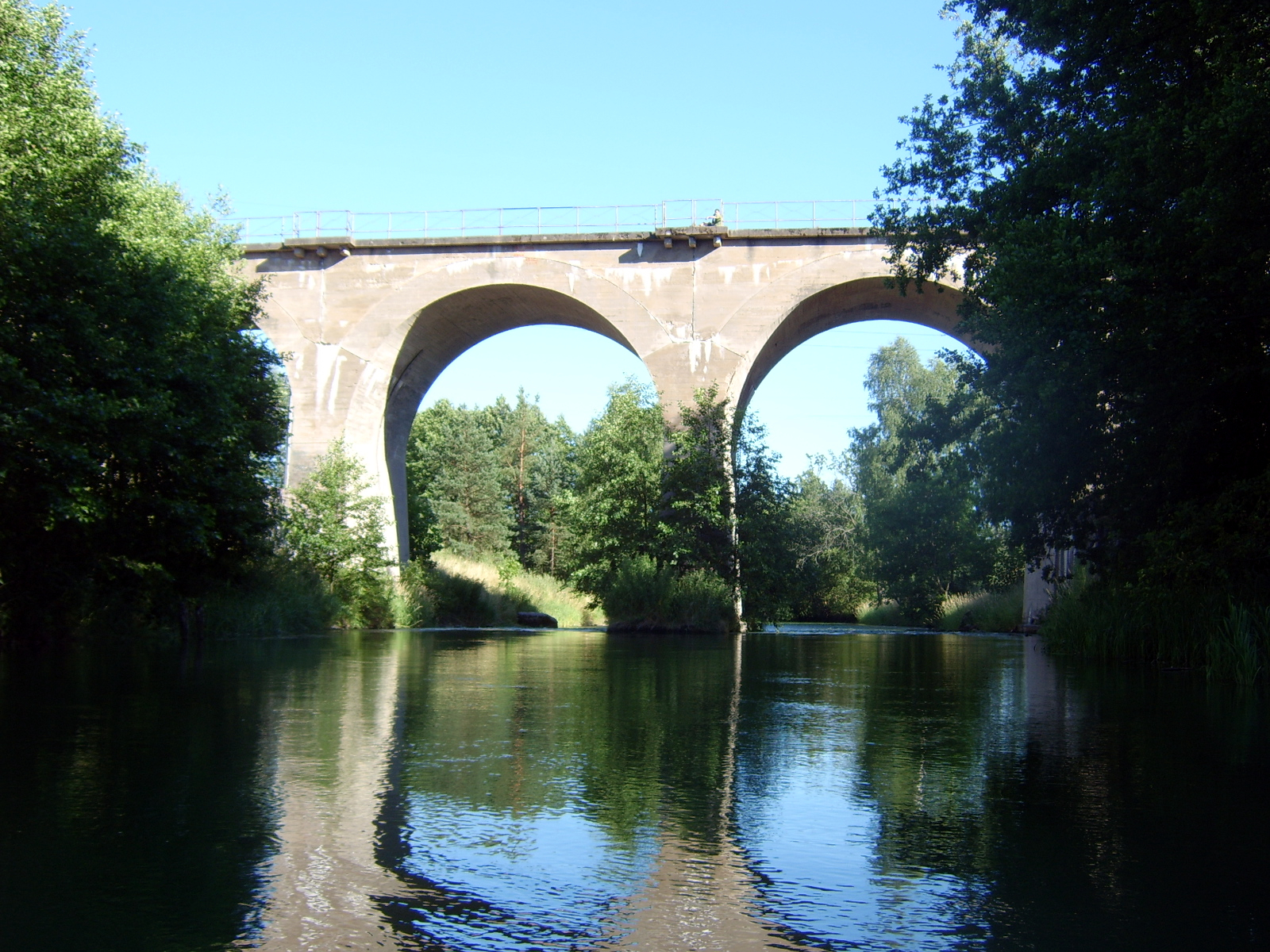
Bridge over the Brda river in Rytel

Rytel was a royal village of the Polish Crown, administratively located in the Tuchola County in the Pomeranian Voivodeship.

During the joint German-Soviet invasion of Poland, which started World War II, Rytel was captured by Nazi Germany on September 3, 1939. During the German occupation, the local Polish population was subjected to various crimes and repressions, including extermination, Germanisation, confiscations of property, expulsions, deportations to Nazi concentration camps and forced conscriptions to the Wehrmacht. The Polish school was closed down, and its library was destroyed. Rytel was one of the sites of executions of Poles, carried out by the Germans in 1939 as part of the Intelligenzaktion. Nevertheless, the Pomeranian Griffin Polish resistance organization was active in Rytel, and secret Polish schooling was organized. In February 1945, the village was captured by the Soviets, and then the Soviet NKVD and Soviet-installed Polish communists repressed the populace, at least 10 inhabitants were either murdered by the NKVD or deported to the Soviet Union.
