= Raduń, Pomeranian Voivodeship =

Raduń
- Village
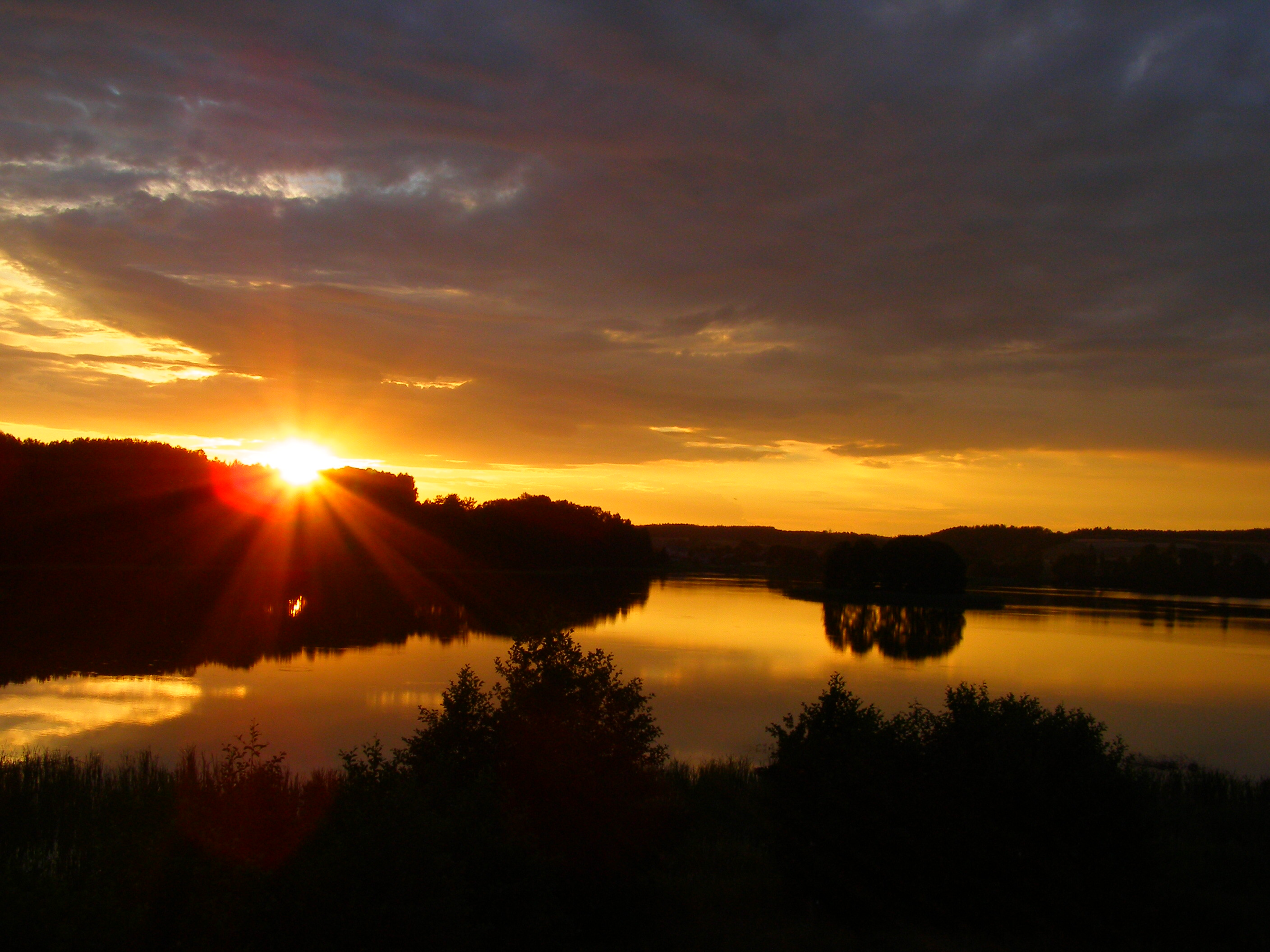
- Raduń Lake

- Location within Poland
- Coordinates: 53°58′10″N 17°45′46″E
- Country: Poland
- Voivodeship: Pomeranian
- County: Kościerzyna
- Gmina: Dziemiany
- Population: 170
- Time zone: UTC+1 (CET)
  - Summer (DST): UTC+2 (CEST)

Raduń [ˈraduɲ] is a village in the administrative district of Gmina Dziemiany, within Kościerzyna County, Pomeranian Voivodeship, in northern Poland. It is located within the ethnocultural region of Kashubia in the historic region of Pomerania.

Raduń was a royal village of the Polish Crown, administratively located in the Tczew County in the Pomeranian Voivodeship.

During the German occupation of Poland (World War II), in 1939 and 1944, the Germans expelled many Polish families from the village, either to the General Government or to forced labour in Germany.
