= Küstrin-Kietz =

Border village in Brandenburg, Germany

- Village of Küstriner Vorland
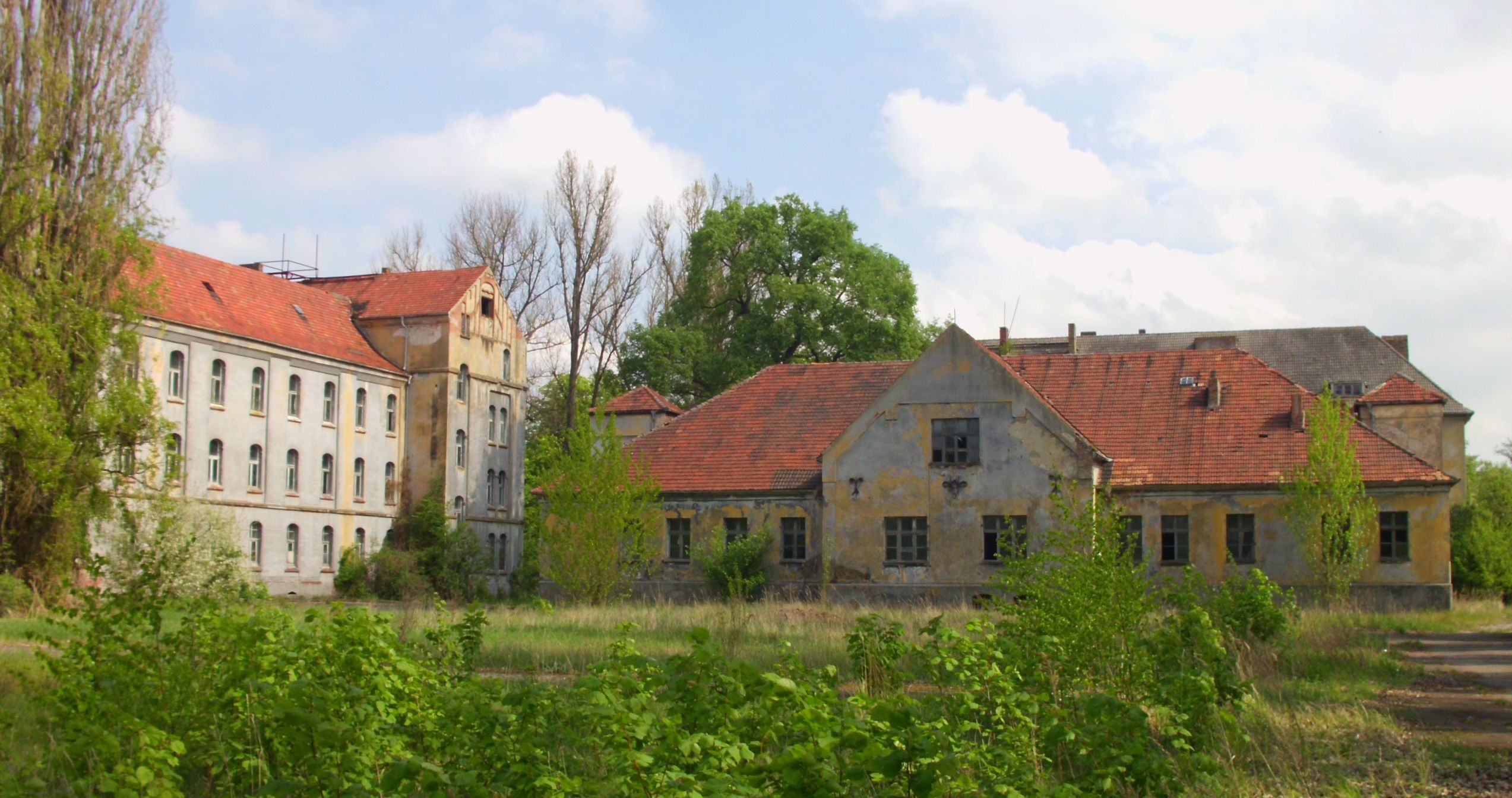
- Küstrin-Kietz Oderinsel-barracks (2013), to 1945 German Artillery Barracks; 1945-1991 barracks of the Soviet Forces in Germany

- Coat of arms
- Interactive map of Küstrin-Kietz
- Location within Germany Location within Brandenburg
- Coordinates: 52°34′9″N 14°36′40″E
- Country: Germany
- State: Brandenburg
- District: Märkisch-Oderland
- Municipality: Küstriner Vorland
- Elevation: 13 m (43 ft)

Population (2016)
  - Total: 727
- Time zone: UTC+01:00 (CET)
  - Summer (DST): UTC+02:00 (CEST)
- Postal codes: 15328

Küstrin-Kietz is a small village in Brandenburg in north-eastern Germany, at the Oder river and the border with Poland. Since 1998 it has been part of the Küstriner Vorland municipality.

== History ==
Historical population
Year	Pop.	±%
1800	557	—
1831	567	+1.8%
1910	638	+12.5%

The indigenous Slavic settlement, known in Polish as Chyża and in German as Kietz was initially located on the right-bank of the Oder River. It was relocated to its present location in 1536 or 1537. It consisted of 60 houses with additional barns and stables, a square, and homesteads for 26 cottagers. It had a school, fire station and a chapel. During the Second Northern War, in 1658, Stefan Czarniecki passed through the settlement on his way to relieve Polish-allied Denmark from Swedish occupation. Fires occurred in 1673, 1683 and 1749. In the 18th century, it was part of the "Long Suburb" of Küstrin, and was mainly agricultural. Only three houses were destroyed during the Russian siege of Küstrin in 1758 in the Seven Years' War. In 1928, it was included within the town limits of Küstrin (Kostrzyn).

Before the implementation of the Oder-Neisse line in 1945, Kietz was the western suburb of the town of Küstrin. According to the Allied Potsdam Agreement, it then became part of the Soviet occupation zone, while the remaining city districts formed present-day Kostrzyn nad Odrą in Poland.

In 1954 the East German authorities made an attempt to rename the place Friedensfelde (literally: "fields of peace"), alluding to the Oder-Neisse line called "border of peace" in official usage. Ultimately the settlement retained its name Kietz, though without a mention of "Küstrin", which would have been considered revanchist by Communist officials. In a 1991 plebiscite the inhabitants voted for "Küstrin-Kietz".

Today Küstrin-Kietz is the site of a major Schengen border crossing, re-opened in 1992 on the Bundesstraße 1 and Droga krajowa No. 22 main road from Berlin to Gorzów Wielkopolski. The Oder bridge of the former Prussian Eastern Railway line was rebuilt after World War II; it is today in use by RegionalBahn trains connecting Kostrzyn with Berlin-Lichtenberg station via Küstrin-Kietz station.

A relic of the Slavic origins of the settlement is a number of tombstones from the 19th and 20th centuries with names of Slavic origin at two local cemeteries.

== See also ==
- Kiez
- Kostrzyn nad Odrą
- Küstriner Vorland
