= Kościerzyna railway station =

Railway station in Kościerzyna, Poland

Kościerzyna
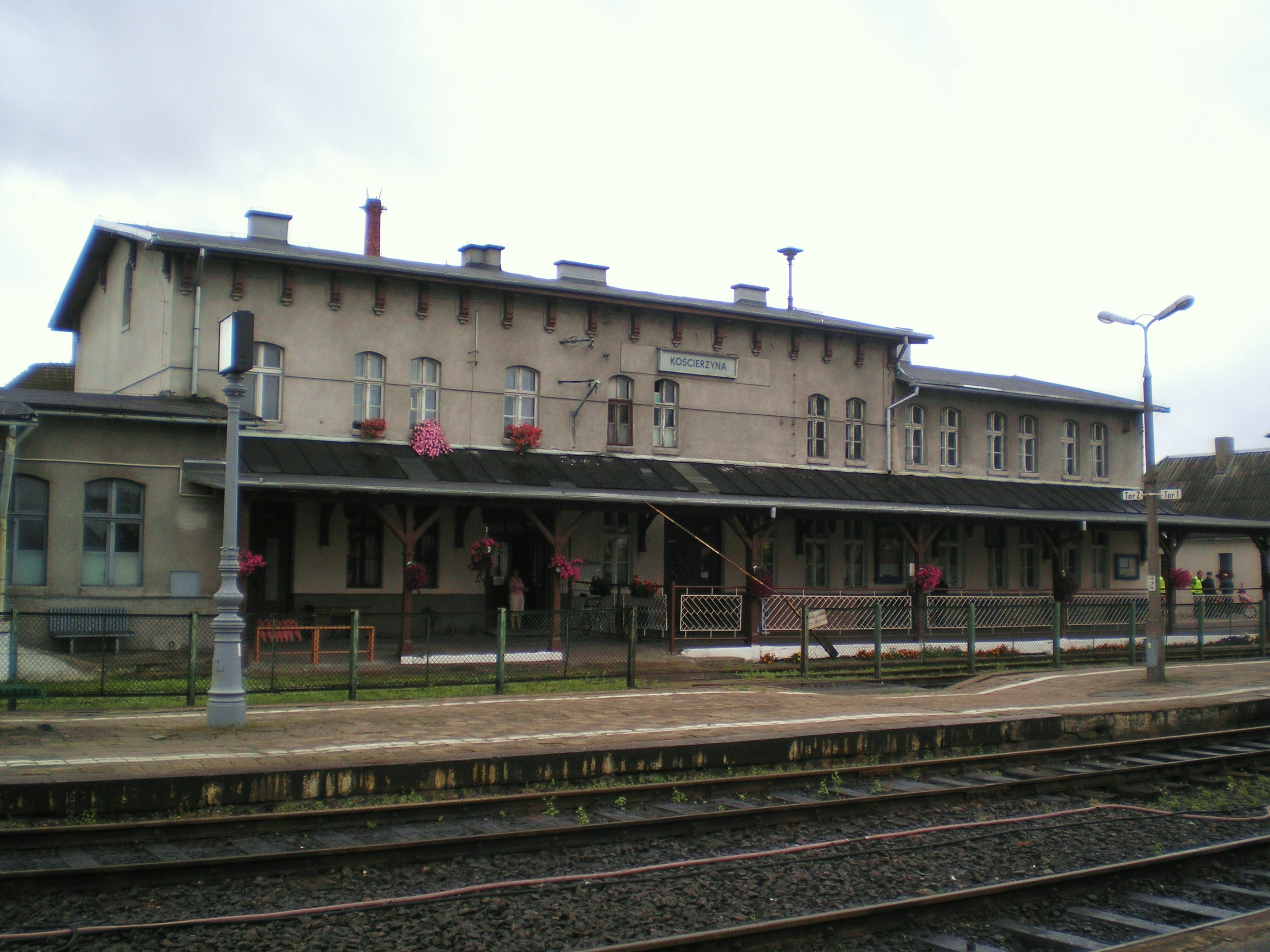
- Kościerzyna railway station in 2007

General information
- Location: Kościerzyna, Pomeranian Voivodeship; Poland
- Coordinates: 54.1210°N 17.9937°E
- System: Railway Station
- Operator: Polregio; SKM Tricity
- Lines: 201: Nowa Wieś Wielka–Gdynia Port railway 211: Chojnice–Kościerzyna railway 233: Pszczółki–Kościerzyna railway (closed)
- Platforms: 4

History
- Opened: 1885; 141 years ago
Location
- Location within Poland

Kościerzyna railway station is a railway station serving the town of Kościerzyna, in the Pomeranian Voivodeship, Poland. The station is located on the Nowa Wieś Wielka–Gdynia Port railway, Chojnice–Kościerzyna railway. The train services are operated by Polregio.

== History ==
The first line built from Pszczółki in the period of 1884 - 1885 reached Kościerzyna in 1885. Five years later, a line from Kościerzyna to Lipusz and Bytów opened. In 1901 another line reached the station (from Kartuzy and in 1928, a part of the Coal Line.

The station also used to lie on the Kościerzyna–Gołubie Kaszubskie railway until its closure in 1930 and Pszczółki–Kościerzyna railway. The station used to be known as Berent (Westpreußen) under German occupation between 1885-1920 and 1939–1945.

== Heritage museum ==
Kościerzyna is famous for its Skansen Parowozownia Kościerzyna railway museum, located near the station, exhibiting many examples of Polish locomotives.

== Train services ==
The station is served by the following services:

- Pomorska Kolej Metropolitalna services (R) Kościerzyna — Gdańsk Port Lotniczy (Airport) — Gdańsk Wrzeszcz — Gdynia Główna
- Pomorska Kolej Metropolitalna services (R) Kościerzyna — Gdańsk Osowa — Gdynia Główna
- Regional services (R) Chojnice - Brusy - Lipusz - Koscierzyna

Preceding station	Polregio	Following station
Terminus	PR (Via Gdańsk Osowa)	Skorzewo towards Gdynia Główna
Terminus	PR (Via Gdańsk Port Lotniczy (Airport) and Gdańsk Wrzeszcz)	Skorzewo towards Gdynia Główna
Łubiana towards Chojnice	PR	Terminus
