= Wędowo =

- Settlement
- Location within Poland
- Coordinates: 53°47′03″N 17°39′35″E
- Country: Poland
- Voivodeship: Pomeranian
- County: Chojnice
- Gmina: Czersk

Wędowo [vɛnˈdɔvɔ] is a settlement in the administrative district of Gmina Czersk, within Chojnice County, Pomeranian Voivodeship, in northern Poland. The town is part of the village of Duży Klonia.

For details of the history of the region, see History of Pomerania.
