= Modrzejewo =

Modrzejewo may refer to the following places:

- Modrzejewo, Gmina Lipnica in Pomeranian Voivodeship (north Poland)
- Modrzejewo, Gmina Tuchomie in Pomeranian Voivodeship (north Poland)
- Modrzejewo, Chojnice County in Pomeranian Voivodeship (north Poland)
