= Szałamaje railway station =

Railway station in Szałamaje, Poland

Coordinates: 53°51′11″N 18°03′17″E

Szałamaje

General information
- Location: Szałamaje; Poland
- Owner: Polskie Koleje Państwowe S.A.
- Platforms: 2

Construction
- Structure type: Building: Closed; Depot: Never existed Water tower: Never existed

History
- Former names: Gotthelf
Location

Szałamaje is a PKP railway station in Szałamaje (Pomeranian Voivodeship), Poland.

== Lines crossing the station ==
Start station	End station	Line type
Nowa Wieś Wielka	Gdynia Port Centralny	Passenger/Freight
