= Ostrowite =

Ostrowite may refer to the following places in Poland:

- Ostrowite, Golub-Dobrzyń County in Kuyavian-Pomeranian Voivodeship (north-central Poland)
- Ostrowite, Lipno County in Kuyavian-Pomeranian Voivodeship (north-central Poland)
- Ostrowite, Świecie County in Kuyavian-Pomeranian Voivodeship (north-central Poland)
- Ostrowite, Rypin County in Kuyavian-Pomeranian Voivodeship (north-central Poland)
- Ostrowite, Gniezno County in Greater Poland Voivodeship (west-central Poland)
- Ostrowite, Słupca County in Greater Poland Voivodeship (west-central Poland)
- Ostrowite, Bytów County in Pomeranian Voivodeship (north Poland)
- Ostrowite, Lubusz Voivodeship (west Poland)
- Ostrowite, Gmina Chojnice in Pomeranian Voivodeship (north Poland)
- Ostrowite, Gmina Czersk in Pomeranian Voivodeship (north Poland)
- Ostrowite, Gmina Pszczółki in Pomeranian Voivodeship (north Poland)
- Ostrowite, Gdańsk County in Pomeranian Voivodeship (north Poland)
- Ostrowite, Kartuzy County in Pomeranian Voivodeship (north Poland)
- Ostrowite, Gmina Gniew in Pomeranian Voivodeship (north Poland)
- Ostrowite, Nowe Miasto County in Warmian-Masurian Voivodeship (north Poland)
- Ostrowite, Ostróda County in Warmian-Masurian Voivodeship (north Poland)
