= Lubne =

Lubne may refer to:

- Lubné, municipality and village in Brno-Country District in the South Moravian Region of the Czech Republic
- Łubne, village in Lesko County, Podkarpackie Voivodeship, Poland

== See also ==
- Pod Łubnę, village in Chojnice County, Pomeranian Voivodeship, Poland
