= Złotowo, Chojnice County =

Złotowo
- Village
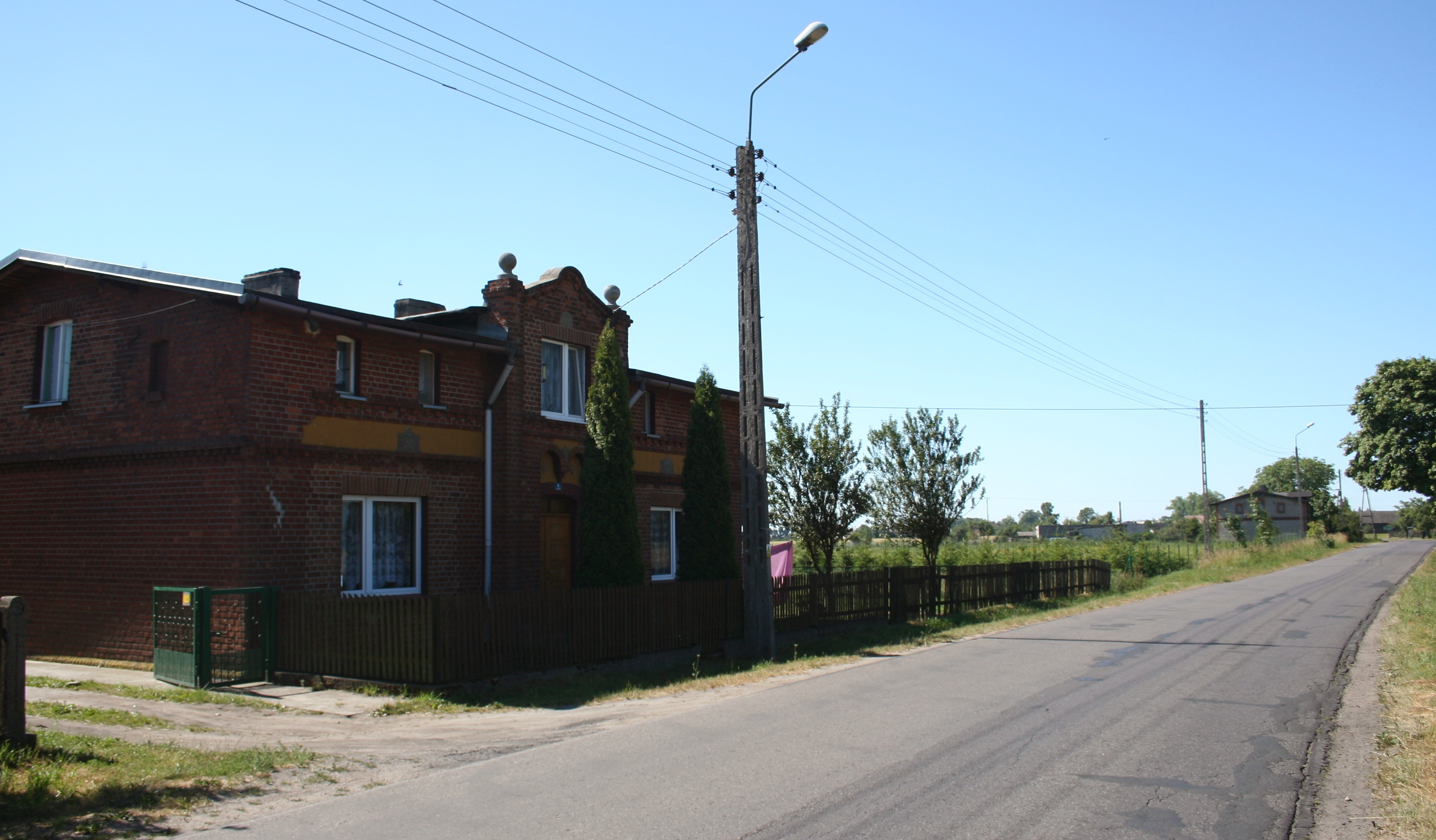

- Location within Poland
- Coordinates: 53°47′39″N 18°0′6″E
- Country: Poland
- Voivodeship: Pomeranian
- County: Chojnice
- Gmina: Czersk
- Population: 797
- Time zone: UTC+1 (CET)
  - Summer (DST): UTC+2 (CEST)
- Vehicle registration: GCH

Złotowo [zwɔˈtɔvɔ] is a village in the administrative district of Gmina Czersk, within Chojnice County, Pomeranian Voivodeship, in northern Poland.
