= Twarożnica =

- Settlement
- Location within Poland
- Coordinates: 53°45′15″N 17°56′55″E
- Country: Poland
- Voivodeship: Pomeranian
- County: Chojnice
- Gmina: Czersk
- Population: 11

Twarożnica [tfarɔʐˈnit͡sa] is a settlement in the administrative district of Gmina Czersk, within Chojnice County, Pomeranian Voivodeship, in northern Poland.

For details of the history of the region, see History of Pomerania.
