= Struga, Chojnice County =

Struga
- Settlement
- Location within Poland
- Coordinates: 53°47′N 18°3′E
- Country: Poland
- Voivodeship: Pomeranian
- County: Chojnice
- Gmina: Czersk
- Population: 62

Struga ([ˈstruɡa]; German: Struga, 1942–45 Fließbrück) is a settlement in the administrative district of Gmina Czersk, within Chojnice County, Pomeranian Voivodeship, in northern Poland.

For details of the history of the region, see History of Pomerania.
