= Ostrowy, Pomeranian Voivodeship =

Ostrowy
- Village
- Location within Poland
- Coordinates: 53°46′57″N 17°46′45″E
- Country: Poland
- Voivodeship: Pomeranian
- County: Chojnice
- Gmina: Czersk
- Time zone: UTC+1 (CET)
  - Summer (DST): UTC+2 (CEST)

Ostrowy [ɔsˈtrɔvɨ] is a village in the administrative district of Gmina Czersk, within Chojnice County, Pomeranian Voivodeship, in northern Poland.
