= Cegielnia, Chojnice County =

Cegielnia
- Village
- Location within Poland
- Coordinates: 53°49′37″N 17°56′19″E
- Country: Poland
- Voivodeship: Pomeranian
- County: Chojnice
- Gmina: Czersk

Cegielnia [t͡sɛˈɡʲɛlɲa] is a village in the administrative district of Gmina Czersk, within Chojnice County, Pomeranian Voivodeship, in northern Poland.

For details of the history of the region, see History of Pomerania.
