= Dąbki, Chojnice County =

Dąbki
- Village
- Location within Poland
- Coordinates: 53°44′59″N 17°59′18″E
- Country: Poland
- Voivodeship: Pomeranian
- County: Chojnice
- Gmina: Czersk
- Population: 81

Dąbki [ˈdɔmpki] is a village in the administrative district of Gmina Czersk, within Chojnice County, Pomeranian Voivodeship, in northern Poland.

For details of the history of the region, see History of Pomerania.
