= Złe Mięso =

- Village
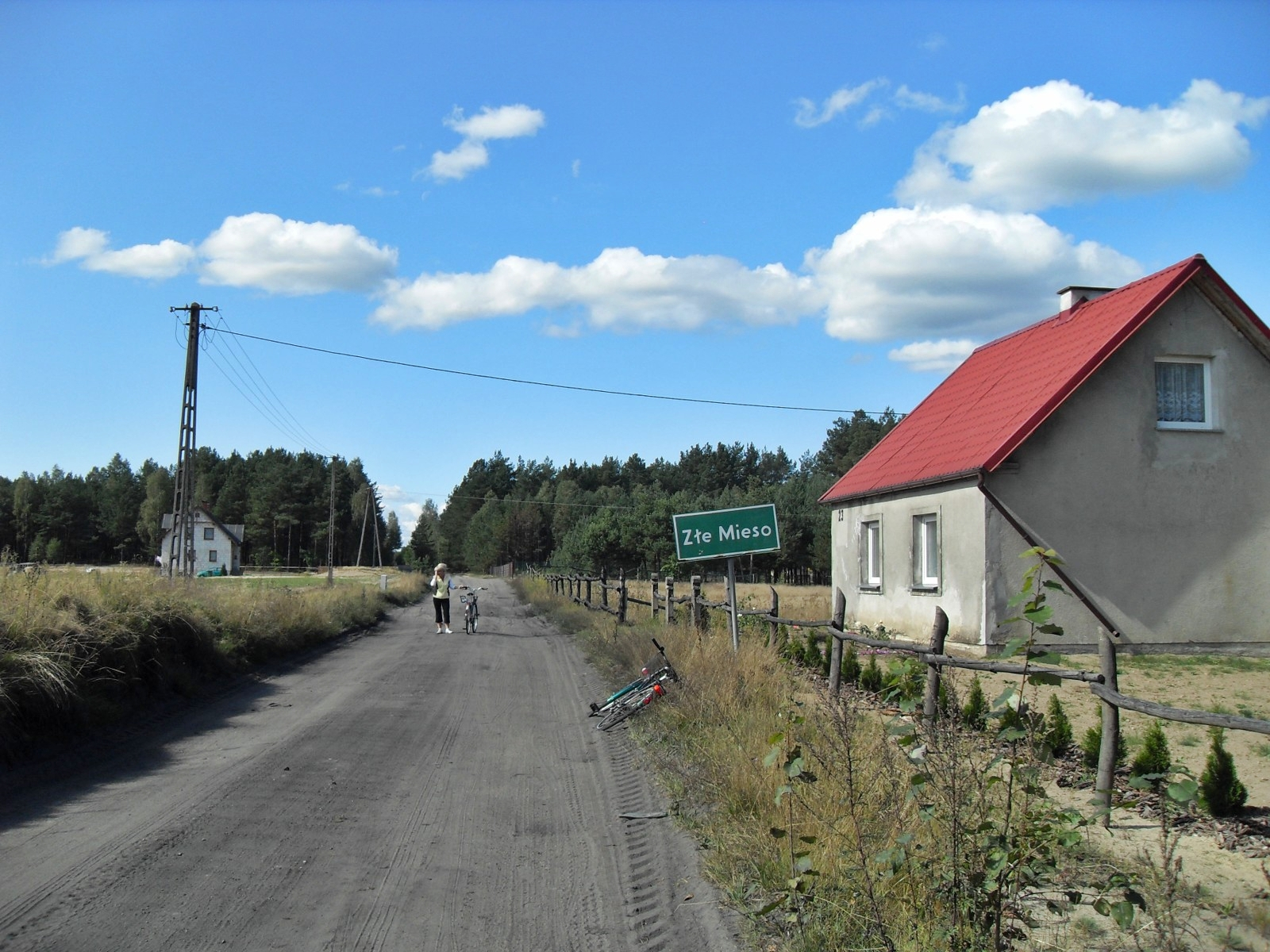
- Entrance to the village

- Location within Poland
- Coordinates: 53°49′41″N 18°6′25″E
- Country: Poland
- Voivodeship: Pomeranian
- County: Chojnice
- Gmina: Czersk
- Population: 195
- Time zone: UTC+1 (CET)
  - Summer (DST): UTC+2 (CEST)
- Vehicle registration: GCH

Złe Mięso [ˈzwɛ ˈmjɛ̃sɔ] (Lit.: Evil Meat or Bad Meat) is a village in the administrative district of Gmina Czersk, within Chojnice County, Pomeranian Voivodeship, in northern Poland. It is located within the Tuchola Forest in the historic region of Pomerania.

== Name and history ==
Earliest written mentions are German-language Boszfleyth (1480) and Bösem fleisch (1495). Polish versions are Liemieszo (1585) then Złe Mięso (1664). The names stabilized by the 17th century in German and Polish as respectively Bösenfleisch and Złe Mięso.

Złe Mięso was a royal village of the Polish Crown, administratively located in the Tuchola County in the Pomeranian Voivodeship. In the 1868 and 1885 it had 70 and 72 inhabitants, respectively, almost exclusively Catholics.

== Legend ==
According to a legend, there was a small inn by a river ford next to the village. The whole affair began when the innkeeper changed here after one of the many wars.

At first, no one noticed that some of the guests staying here for a meal and a night did not reach their destination later. After several years of careful observation, a terrible secret was discovered. This innkeeper not only murdered and robbed his guests, but also used the corpses to make food which was later given to customers.

== Archaeology ==
According to a 1994 dig, the village existed in the Neolithic 6000 years ago, and has been since inhabited continuously or near-continuously.
