= Klonowice =

- Village
- Location within Poland
- Coordinates: 53°52′25″N 18°3′51″E
- Country: Poland
- Voivodeship: Pomeranian
- County: Chojnice
- Gmina: Czersk
- Population: 9

Klonowice ([klɔnɔˈvit͡sɛ]) is a village in the administrative district of Gmina Czersk, within Chojnice County, Pomeranian Voivodeship, in northern Poland.

There is archaeological station of the University of Łódź in the village.

For details of the history of the region, see History of Pomerania.
