= Łukowo, Pomeranian Voivodeship =

Łukowo
- Village
- Location within Poland
- Coordinates: 53°45′50″N 17°55′51″E
- Country: Poland
- Voivodeship: Pomeranian
- County: Chojnice
- Gmina: Czersk

Population
  - Total: 111
- Time zone: UTC+1 (CET)
  - Summer (DST): UTC+2 (CEST)
- Vehicle registration: GCH

Łukowo [wuˈkɔvɔ] is a village in the administrative district of Gmina Czersk, within Chojnice County, Pomeranian Voivodeship, in northern Poland. It is located in the Tuchola Forest in the historic region of Pomerania.

== History ==
During World War I, the German administration operated a prisoner-of-war camp in the village. It held mostly Russian POWs, including many ethnic Poles conscripted to the Russian Army, but also English, Romanian, Serbian, Italian, Portuguese, French and Belgian POWs. Some 50,000 POWs passed through the camp.

According to the 1921 census, the village had a population of 228, entirely Polish by nationality and Roman Catholic by confession.

During World War II, the local forest was the site of a massacre of 28 Poles from nearby Czersk and Mokre, committed by the Germans on November 4, 1939 (see also Nazi crimes against the Polish nation). There is a memorial at the site.
