= Wojtal railway station =

Railway station in Wojtal, Poland

Coordinates: 53°53′45″N 18°02′20″E

Wojtal

General information
- Location: Wojtal; Poland
- Owner: Polskie Koleje Państwowe S.A.
- Platforms: 1

Construction
- Structure type: Building: Never existed Depot: Never existed Water tower: Never existed

History
- Former names: Woithal
Location

Wojtal is a PKP railway station in Wojtal (Pomeranian Voivodeship), Poland.

== Lines crossing the station ==
Start station	End station	Line type
Nowa Wieś Wielka	Gdynia Port Centralny	Passenger/Freight
