= Koślinka =

Koślinka may refer to the following places:

- Koślinka, Kuyavian-Pomeranian Voivodeship (north-central Poland)
- Koślinka, Chojnice County in Pomeranian Voivodeship (north Poland)
- Koślinka, Pomeranian Voivodeship (north Poland)
