= Łąg =

- Village
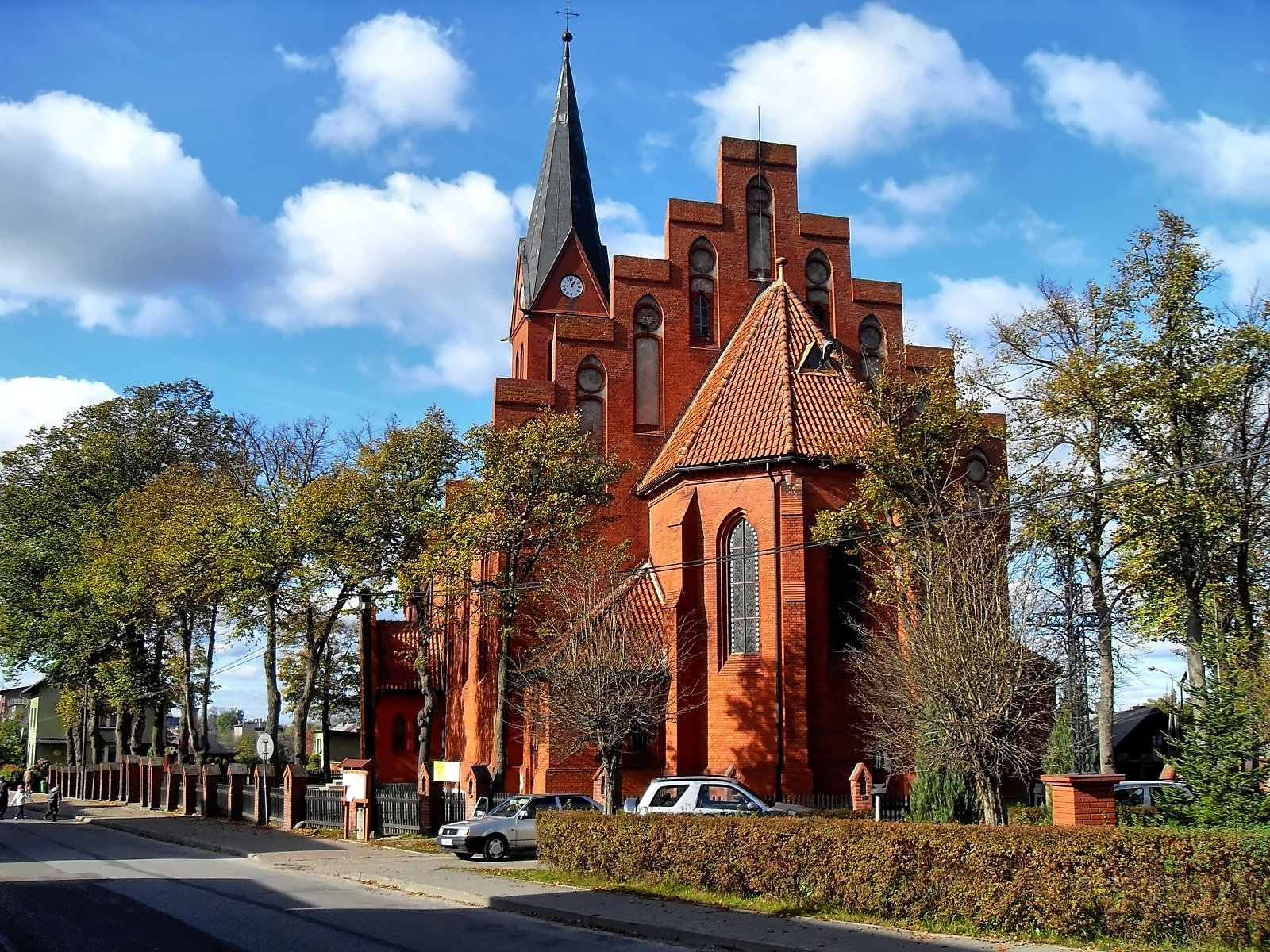
- Church of the Nativity of the Virgin Mary in Łąg

- Location within Poland
- Coordinates: 53°49′45″N 18°3′52″E
- Country: Poland
- Voivodeship: Pomeranian
- County: Chojnice
- Gmina: Czersk
- Population: 1,135
- Time zone: UTC+1 (CET)
  - Summer (DST): UTC+2 (CEST)
- Vehicle registration: GCH
- Website: http://solectwo-lag.go.pl/

Łąg [wɔnk] is a village in the administrative district of Gmina Czersk, within Chojnice County, Pomeranian Voivodeship, in northern Poland. It is located within the historic region of Pomerania.

== History ==
Łąg was a royal village of the Polish Crown, administratively located in the Tuchola County in the Pomeranian Voivodeship.

In 1904, a local branch of the "Sokół" Polish Gymnastic Society was founded in the village.

During the German occupation of Poland (World War II), in 1942, the Germans carried out expulsions of Poles, who were initially held in the Potulice concentration camp, and then some were deported to forced labour in Germany, while their farms were handed over to German colonists as part of the Lebensraum policy.

== Locations ==
- Łąg Południowy railway station

== Notable people ==
- Augustyn Worzałła (1837–1905), Polish Catholic priest and activist, local parish priest
