= Krzyż =

Krzyż may refer to:

- Krzyż, Łódź Voivodeship (central Poland)
- Krzyż, Pomeranian Voivodeship (north Poland)
- Krzyż, Świętokrzyskie Voivodeship (south-central Poland)
- Krzyż, Warmian-Masurian Voivodeship (north Poland)
- Krzyż Wielkopolski (north western Poland)
