= Bielawy, Chojnice County =

Bielawy
- Village
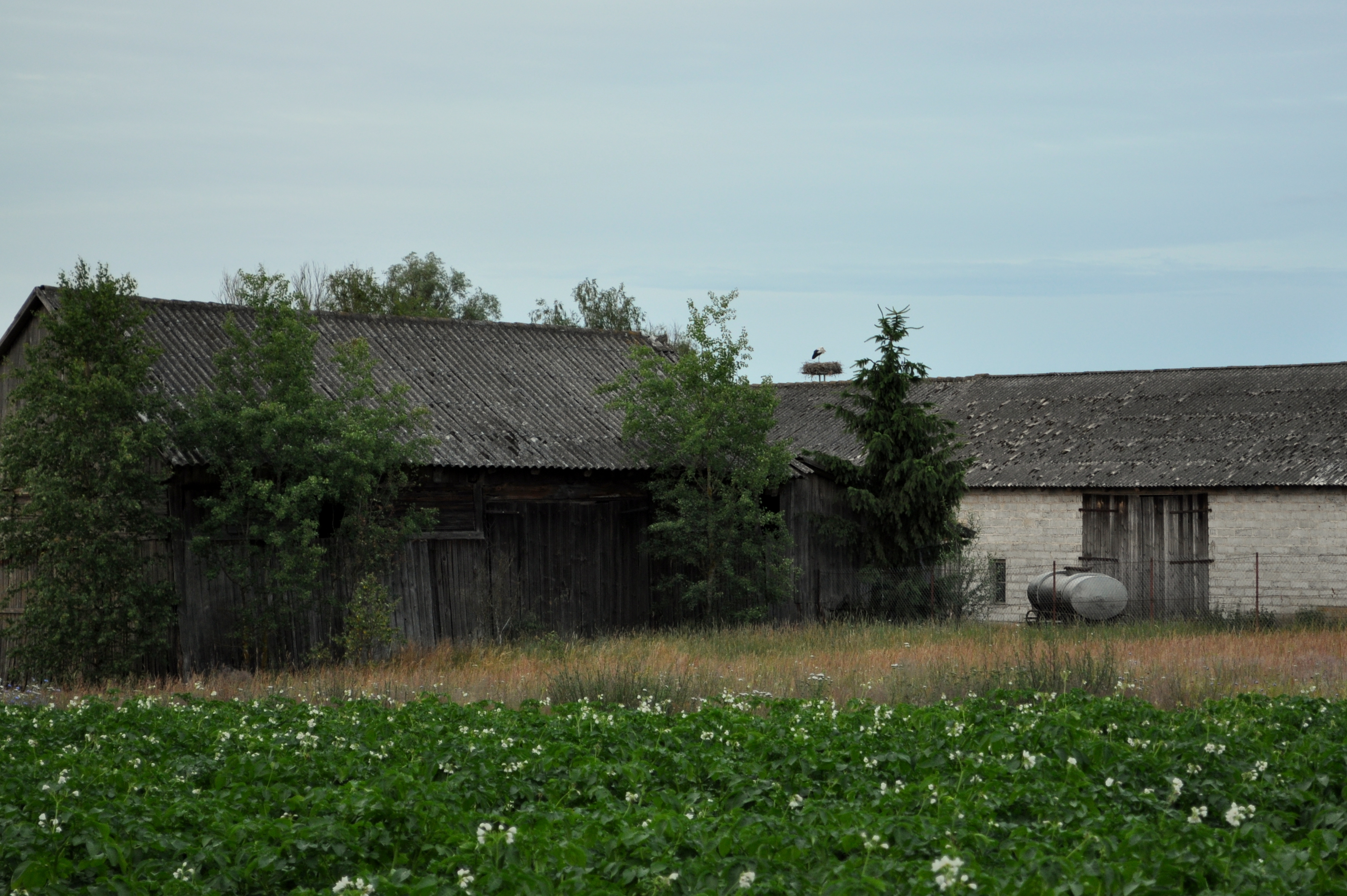

- Location within Poland
- Coordinates: 53°50′N 17°51′E
- Country: Poland
- Voivodeship: Pomeranian
- County: Chojnice
- Gmina: Czersk

Population
  - Total: 53
- Postal code: 89-642
- Vehicle registration: GCH

Bielawy ([bjɛˈlavɨ]; German: Bielawi, 1942–45 Blankenbruch) is a village in the administrative district of Gmina Czersk, within Chojnice County, Pomeranian Voivodeship, in northern Poland.

Five Polish citizens were murdered by Nazi Germany in the village during World War II.
