= Szałamaje =

- Settlement
- Location within Poland
- Coordinates: 53°51′13″N 18°3′19″E
- Country: Poland
- Voivodeship: Pomeranian
- County: Chojnice
- Gmina: Czersk
- Population: 61

Szałamaje [ʂawaˈmajɛ] is a settlement in the administrative district of Gmina Czersk, within Chojnice County, Pomeranian Voivodeship, in northern Poland.

For details of the history of the region, see History of Pomerania.

== Transport ==
Szałamaje boasts its own self-named railway station; a PSR (Polish State Railways - PKP in Polish) station. The station serves both passenger and freight trains. Its start station being Nowa Wieś Wielka and end station Gdynia Port Centralny.
