= Klaskawa =

- Village
- Location within Poland
- Coordinates: 53°46′N 18°3′E
- Country: Poland
- Voivodeship: Pomeranian
- County: Chojnice
- Gmina: Czersk
- Population: 148

Klaskawa [klasˈkava] is a village in the administrative district of Gmina Czersk, within Chojnice County, Pomeranian Voivodeship, in northern Poland.

For details of the history of the region, see History of Pomerania.
