= Konigórtek =

Settlement in Gmina Czersk, Poland

- Settlement
- Location within Poland
- Coordinates: 53°45′38″N 17°44′10″E
- Country: Poland
- Voivodeship: Pomeranian
- County: Chojnice
- Gmina: Czersk

Konigórtek [kɔniˈɡurtɛk] is a settlement in the administrative district of Gmina Czersk, within Chojnice County, Pomeranian Voivodeship, in northern Poland.

For details of the history of the region, see History of Pomerania.
