= Odry, Poland =

Odry
- Village
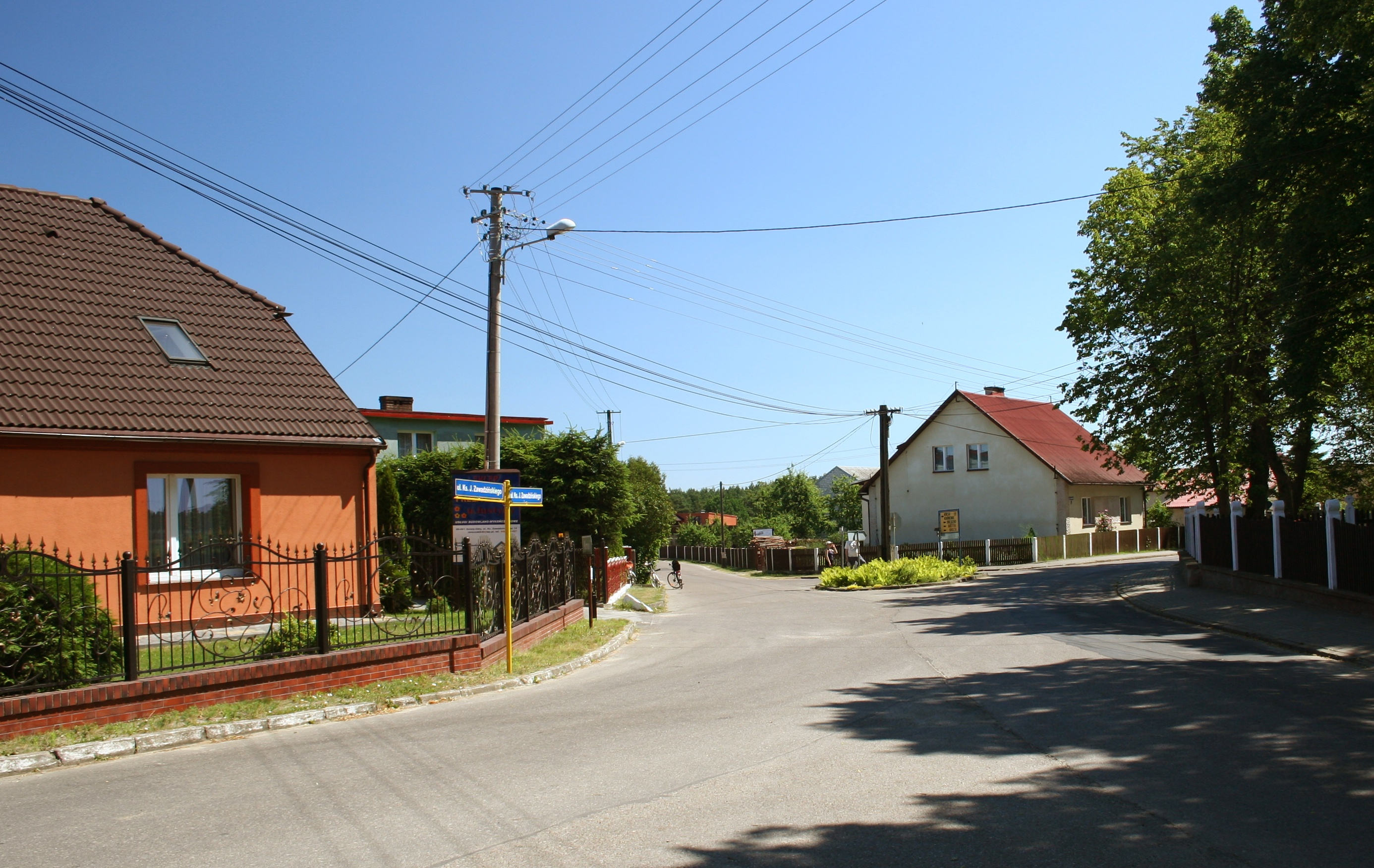
- Village center

- Location within Poland
- Coordinates: 53°53′27″N 18°1′10″E
- Country: Poland
- Voivodeship: Pomeranian
- County: Chojnice
- Gmina: Czersk

Population
  - Total: 417
- Postal code: 89-651

Odry [ˈɔdrɨ] is a village in the administrative district of Gmina Czersk, in Chojnice County, Pomeranian Voivodeship, in northern Poland.

Odry is home to the greatest concentration of stone circles of the Wielbark Culture in Pomerania in Poland; the site contains at least 602 burial sites.

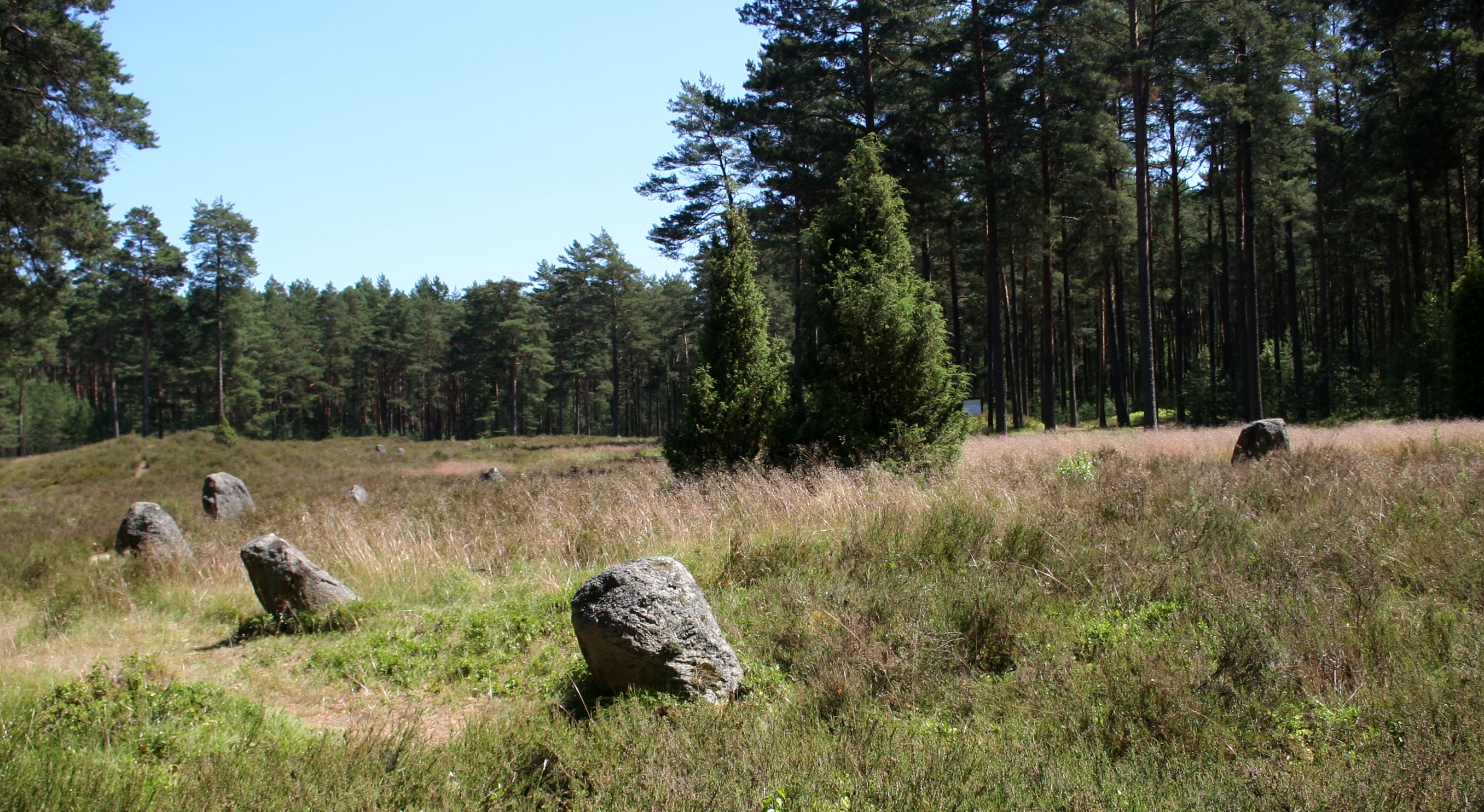
Section of an Iron Age stone circle
