= Bukowa Góra =

Bukowa Góra may refer to the following places:

- Bukowa Góra, Chojnice County in Pomeranian Voivodeship (north Poland)
- Bukowa Góra, Gmina Kartuzy in Pomeranian Voivodeship (north Poland)
- Bukowa Góra, West Pomeranian Voivodeship (north-west Poland)
- Bukowa Góra, Gmina Sulęczyno in Pomeranian Voivodeship (north Poland)
- Bukowa Góra, Warmian-Masurian Voivodeship (north Poland)
- Bukowa Góra, Świętokrzyskie Mountains, a mountain in the Świętokrzyskie Mountains of south central Poland
