= Wądoły-Łąg =

- Village
- Location within Poland
- Coordinates: 53°49′39″N 18°5′37″E
- Country: Poland
- Voivodeship: Pomeranian
- County: Chojnice
- Gmina: Czersk
- Population: 129

Wądoły-Łąg [vɔnˈdɔwɨ ˈwɔnk] is a village in the administrative district of Gmina Czersk, in Chojnice County, Pomeranian Voivodeship, in northern Poland.

== See also ==
- History of Pomerania.
