= Żukowo (disambiguation) =

Żukowo may refer to the following places:

- Żukowo, Płock County in Masovian Voivodeship (east-central Poland)
- Żukowo, Płońsk County in Masovian Voivodeship (east-central Poland)
- Żukowo in Pomeranian Voivodeship (north Poland)
- Żukowo, Greater Poland Voivodeship (west-central Poland)
- Żukowo, Chojnice County in Pomeranian Voivodeship (north Poland)
- Żukowo, Człuchów County in Pomeranian Voivodeship (north Poland)
- Żukowo, Gryfice County in West Pomeranian Voivodeship (north-west Poland)
- Żukowo, Sławno County in West Pomeranian Voivodeship (north-west Poland)
- Żukowo, Stargard County in West Pomeranian Voivodeship (north-west Poland)
