= Kamionka, Chojnice County =

Kamionka
- Village
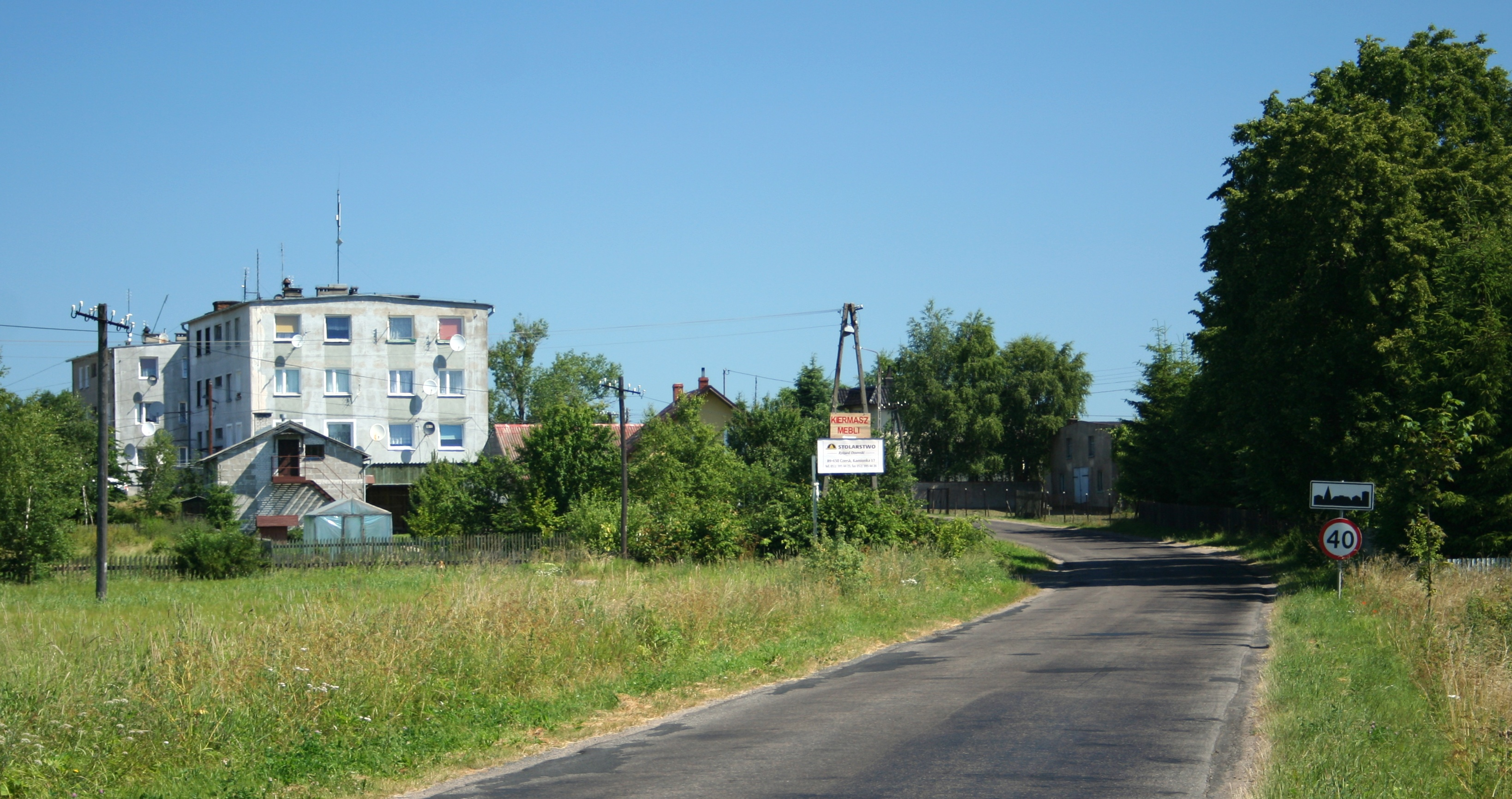
- Road in Kamionka

- Location within Poland
- Coordinates: 53°49′47″N 18°00′27″E
- Country: Poland
- Voivodeship: Pomeranian
- County: Chojnice
- Gmina: Czersk
- Population: 132

Kamionka ([kaˈmjɔnka]; German: Kamionka, 1942–45 Heidefließ) is a village in the administrative district of Gmina Czersk, within Chojnice County, Pomeranian Voivodeship, in northern Poland.

For details of the history of the region, see History of Pomerania.
