= Stare Prusy, Pomeranian Voivodeship =

Stare Prusy
- Village
- Location within Poland
- Coordinates: 53°51′0″N 18°3′7″E
- Country: Poland
- Voivodeship: Pomeranian
- County: Chojnice
- Gmina: Czersk
- Population: 84

Stare Prusy [ˈstarɛ ˈprusɨ] is a village in the administrative district of Gmina Czersk, within Chojnice County, Pomeranian Voivodeship, in northern Poland.

For details of the history of the region, see History of Pomerania.
