= Mokre, Chojnice County =

Mokre
- Village
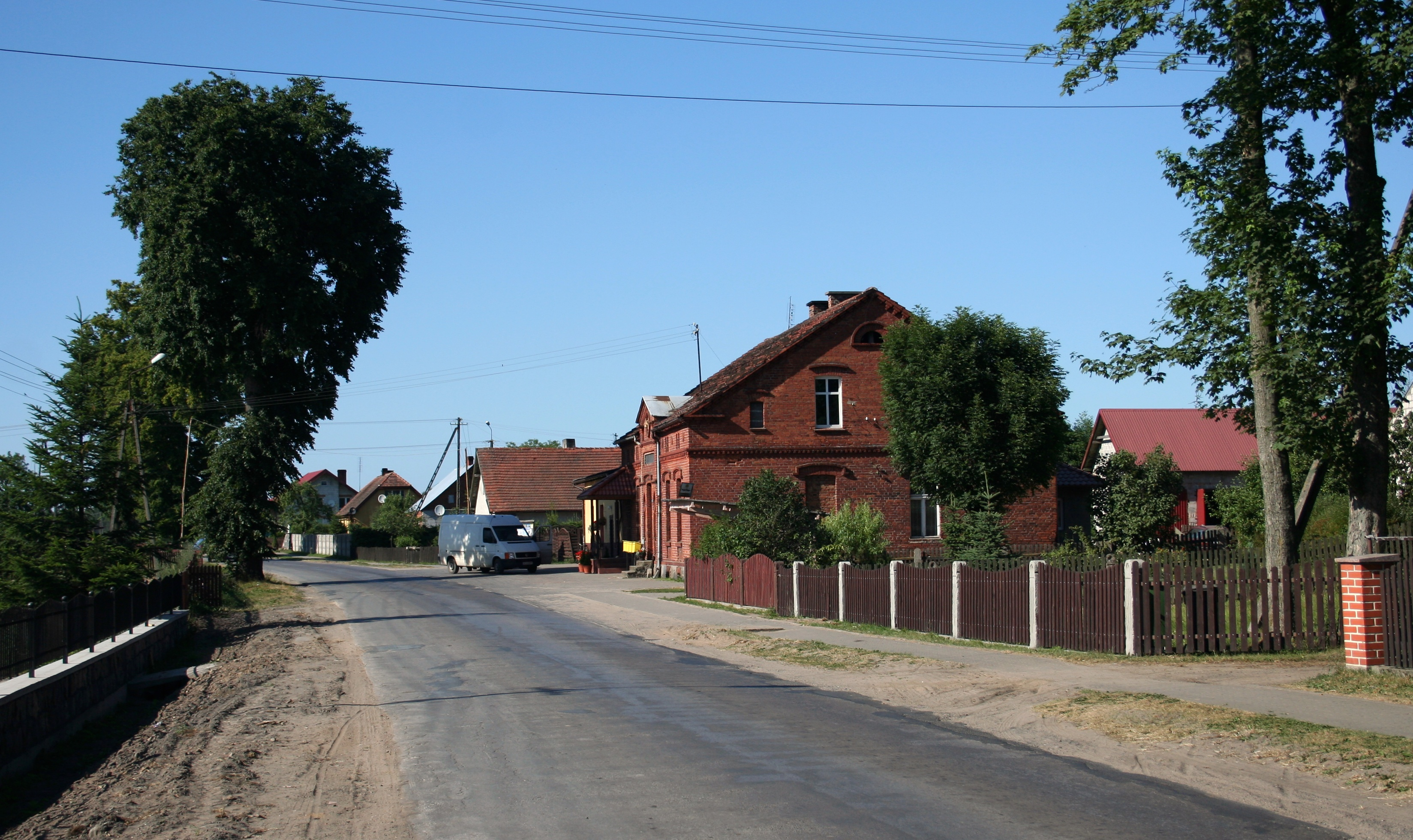

- Location within Poland
- Coordinates: 53°50′21″N 17°56′59″E
- Country: Poland
- Voivodeship: Pomeranian
- County: Chojnice
- Gmina: Czersk
- Population: 231
- Time zone: UTC+1 (CET)
  - Summer (DST): UTC+2 (CEST)
- Vehicle registration: GCH

Mokre [ˈmɔkrɛ] is a village in the administrative district of Gmina Czersk, within Chojnice County, Pomeranian Voivodeship, in northern Poland.

== History ==
Mokre was a private village of Polish nobility, including the Mokierski and Osowski families of Leliwa coat of arms, administratively located in the Tuchola County in the Pomeranian Voivodeship of the Kingdom of Poland.

During the German occupation of Poland (World War II), in 1939, some local Poles were massacred by the occupiers in nearby Łukowo, and some were expelled, with their houses and farms handed over to Germans in accordance with the Lebensraum policy.
