= Jeziorko =

Jeziorko may refer to:

- Jeziorko, Greater Poland Voivodeship (west-central Poland)
- Jeziorko, Łowicz County in Łódź Voivodeship (central Poland)
- Jeziorko, Łódź East County in Łódź Voivodeship (central Poland)
- Jeziorko, Pabianice County in Łódź Voivodeship (central Poland)
- Jeziorko, Wieluń County in Łódź Voivodeship (central Poland)
- Jeziorko, Zduńska Wola County in Łódź Voivodeship (central Poland)
- Jeziórko, Masovian Voivodeship (east-central Poland)
- Jeziorko, Podlaskie Voivodeship (north-east Poland)
- Jeziórko, Pomeranian Voivodeship (north Poland)
- Jeziorko, Świętokrzyskie Voivodeship (south-central Poland)
- Jeziorko, Braniewo County in Warmian-Masurian Voivodeship (north Poland)
- Jeziorko, Giżycko County in Warmian-Masurian Voivodeship (north Poland)
- Jeziorko, West Pomeranian Voivodeship (north-west Poland)
