= Nowe Prusy =

- Village
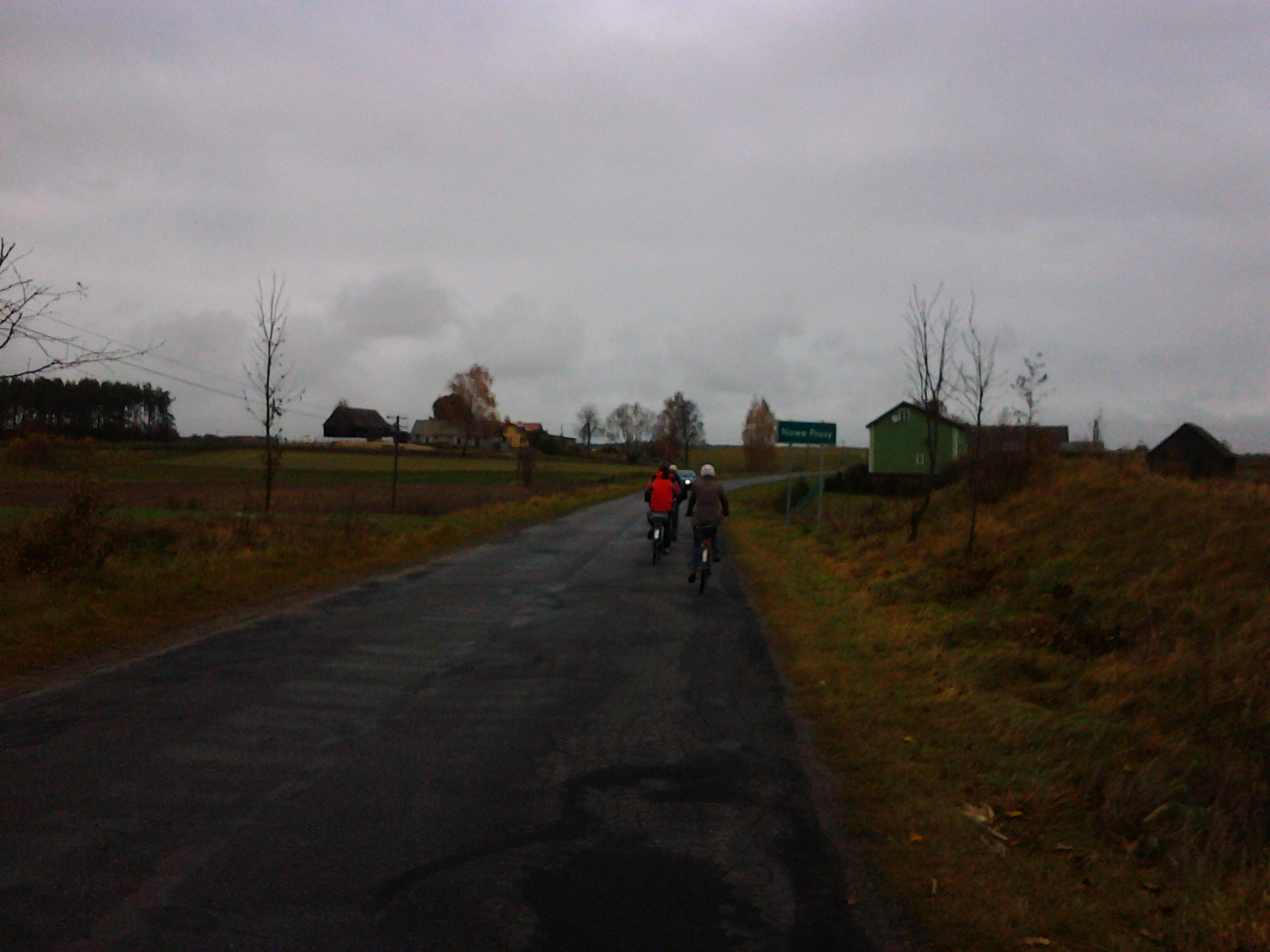

- Location within Poland
- Coordinates: 53°51′4″N 18°0′59″E
- Country: Poland
- Voivodeship: Pomeranian
- County: Chojnice
- Gmina: Czersk
- Population: 154

Nowe Prusy [ˈnɔvɛ ˈprusɨ] is a village in the administrative district of Gmina Czersk, within Chojnice County, Pomeranian Voivodeship, in northern Poland.

For details of the history of the region, see History of Pomerania.
