= Polana, Pomeranian Voivodeship =

Village in Gmina Czersk, Poland

Polana
- Village
- Location within Poland
- Coordinates: 53°52′17″N 17°58′32″E
- Country: Poland
- Voivodeship: Pomeranian
- County: Chojnice
- Gmina: Czersk
- Population: 1

Polana [pɔˈlana] is a village in the administrative district of Gmina Czersk, within Chojnice County, Pomeranian Voivodeship, in northern Poland.

For details of the history of the region, see History of Pomerania.
