= Kameron =

- Settlement
- Location within Poland
- Coordinates: 53°44′34″N 18°1′57″E
- Country: Poland
- Voivodeship: Pomeranian
- County: Chojnice
- Gmina: Czersk

Kameron [kaˈmɛrɔn] is a village in the administrative district of Gmina Czersk, in Chojnice County, Pomeranian Voivodeship, in northern Poland.

== See also ==
- History of Pomerania.
