= Nowa Juńcza =

- Settlement
- Location within Poland
- Coordinates: 53°50′31″N 17°59′31″E
- Country: Poland
- Voivodeship: Pomeranian
- County: Chojnice
- Gmina: Czersk
- Population: 49

Nowa Juńcza [ˈnɔva ˈjuɲt͡ʂa] is a settlement in the administrative district of Gmina Czersk, within Chojnice County, Pomeranian Voivodeship, in northern Poland.

For details of the history of the region, see History of Pomerania.
