= Uroża =

- Settlement
- Location within Poland
- Coordinates: 53°54′11″N 18°00′20″E
- Country: Poland
- Voivodeship: Pomeranian
- County: Chojnice
- Gmina: Czersk
- Population: 7

Uroża [uˈrɔʐa] is a settlement in the administrative district of Gmina Czersk, within Chojnice County, Pomeranian Voivodeship, in northern Poland.
