= Lutomski Most =

- Settlement
- Location within Poland
- Coordinates: 53°41′45″N 17°50′45″E
- Country: Poland
- Voivodeship: Pomeranian
- County: Chojnice
- Gmina: Czersk

Lutomski Most [luˈtɔmski ˈmɔst] is a settlement in the administrative district of Gmina Czersk, within Chojnice County, Pomeranian Voivodeship, in northern Poland.

For details of the history of the region, see History of Pomerania.
