= Bagna =

Bagna may refer to:

- Bagna, Pomeranian Voivodeship (north Poland)
- Bagna, Silesian Voivodeship (south Poland)
- Bagna, West Pomeranian Voivodeship (north-west Poland)
