= Wojtal =

- Village
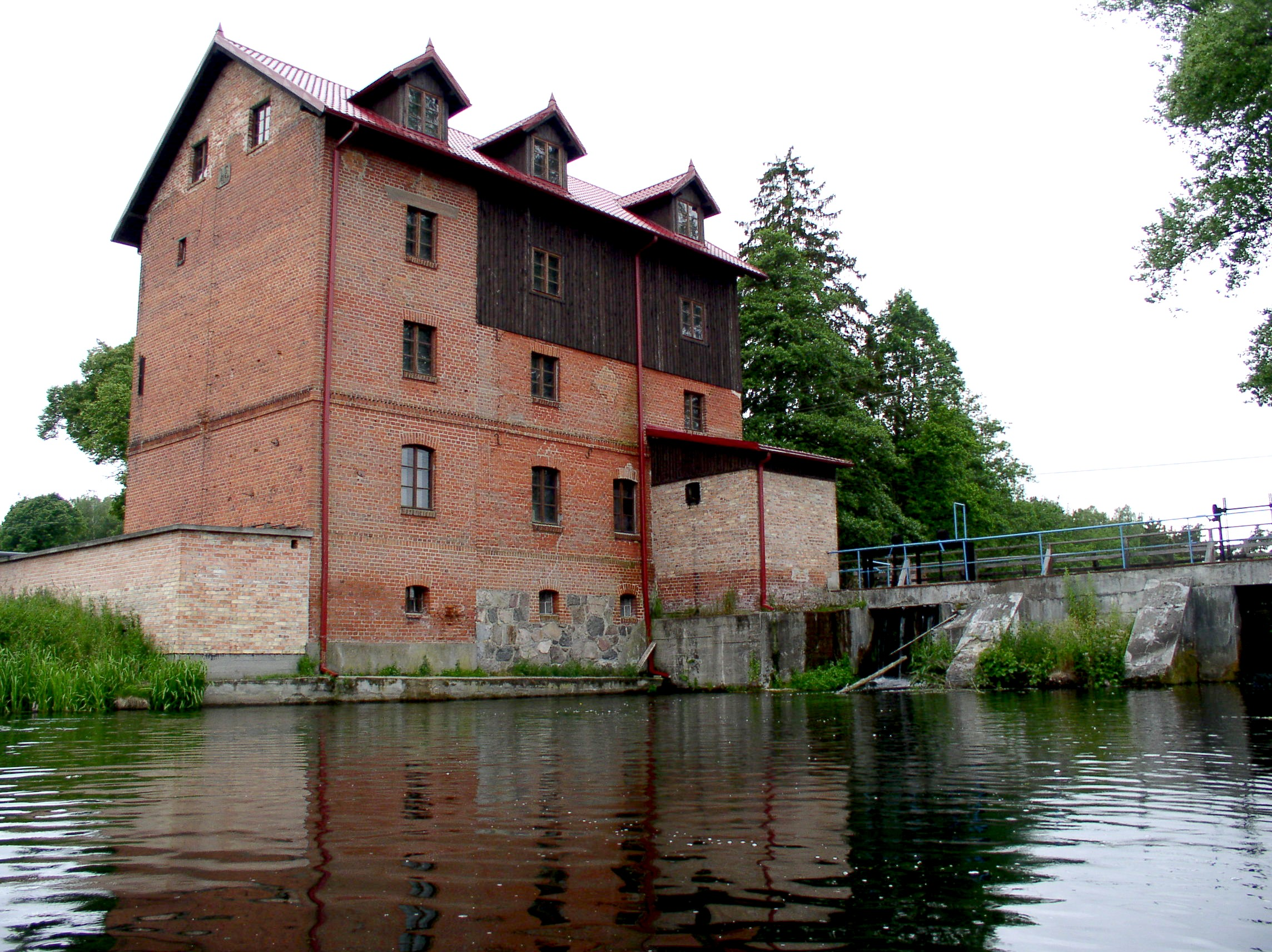
- Old watermill in Wojtal

- Location within Poland
- Coordinates: 53°53′38″N 18°2′3″E
- Country: Poland
- Voivodeship: Pomeranian
- County: Chojnice
- Gmina: Czersk
- Population: 202
- Time zone: UTC+1 (CET)
  - Summer (DST): UTC+2 (CEST)
- Vehicle registration: GCH

Wojtal [ˈvɔi̯tal] is a village in the administrative district of Gmina Czersk, within Chojnice County, Pomeranian Voivodeship, in northern Poland. It is located within the historic region of Pomerania.

== History ==
Wojtal was a royal village of the Polish Crown, administratively located in the Tuchola County in the Pomeranian Voivodeship.

During the German occupation of Poland (World War II), in 1940, the occupiers carried out expulsions of Poles, who were deported to the General Government (German-occupied central Poland), while their farms were then handed over to German colonists as part of the Lebensraum policy.

== Transportation ==
Wojtal railway station is located in the village.
