= Łąg-Kolonia =

- Village
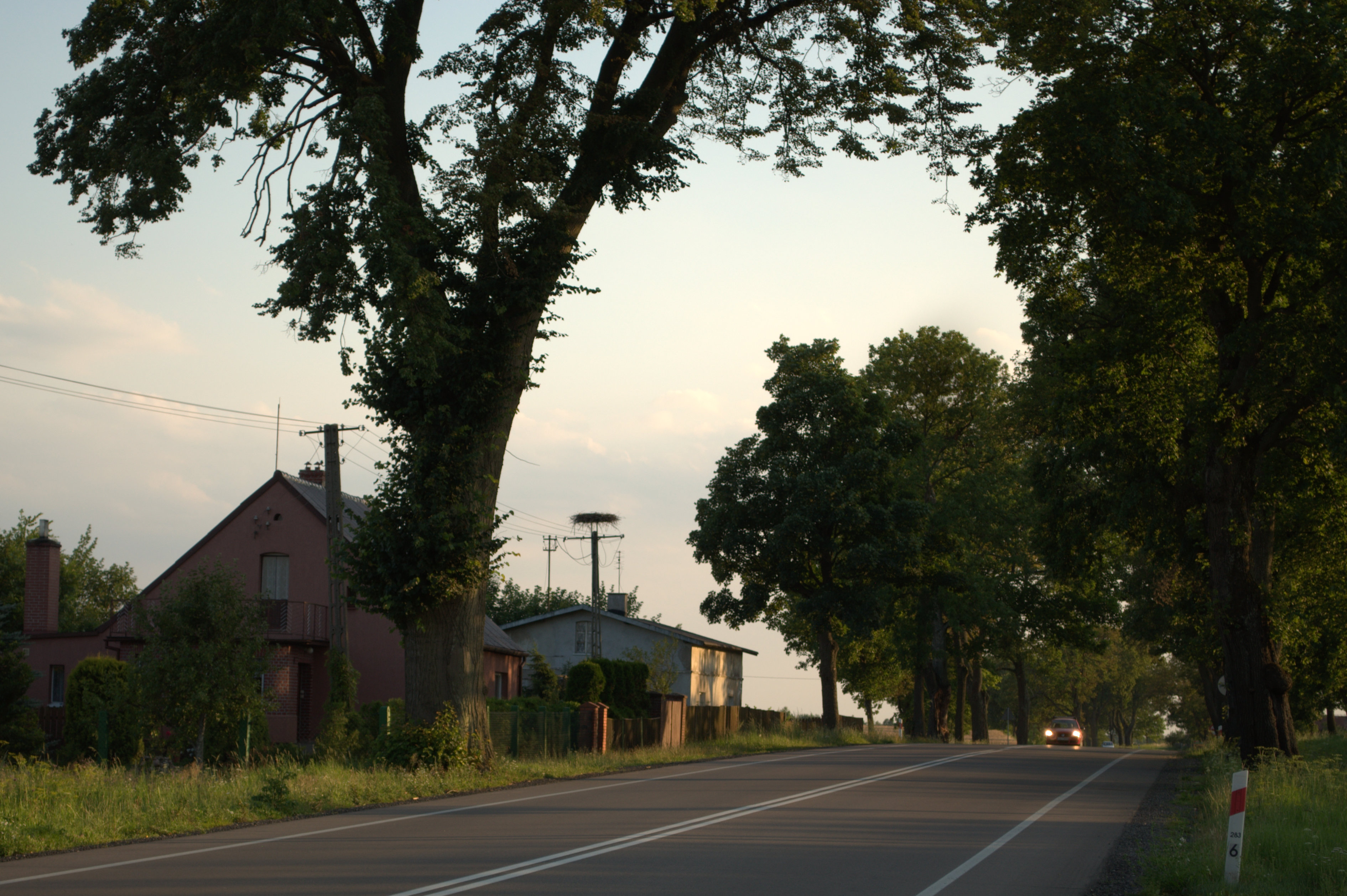

- Location within Poland
- Coordinates: 53°49′40″N 18°02′18″E
- Country: Poland
- Voivodeship: Pomeranian
- County: Chojnice
- Gmina: Czersk
- Population: 404

Łąg-Kolonia [ˈwɔnk kɔˈlɔɲa] is a village in the administrative district of Gmina Czersk, within Chojnice County, Pomeranian Voivodeship, in northern Poland.

For details of the history of the region, see History of Pomerania.
