= Błoto, Pomeranian Voivodeship =

Błoto
- Settlement
- Location within Poland
- Coordinates: 53°45′56″N 17°47′41″E
- Country: Poland
- Voivodeship: Pomeranian
- County: Chojnice
- Gmina: Czersk

Błoto [ˈbwɔtɔ] is a settlement in the administrative district of Gmina Czersk, within Chojnice County, Pomeranian Voivodeship, in northern Poland.
