= Budziska, Pomeranian Voivodeship =

Budziska
- Settlement
- Location within Poland
- Coordinates: 53°49′19″N 18°0′47″E
- Country: Poland
- Voivodeship: Pomeranian
- County: Chojnice
- Gmina: Czersk
- Population: 10
- Time zone: UTC+1 (CET)
  - Summer (DST): UTC+2 (CEST)

Budziska [buˈd͡ʑiska] is a settlement in the administrative district of Gmina Czersk, within Chojnice County, Pomeranian Voivodeship, in northern Poland.
