= Łąg Południowy railway station =

Railway station in Łąg, Poland

Łąg Południowy

General information
- Location: Łąg; Poland
- Coordinates: 53.830899°N 18.063136°E
- Owner: Polskie Koleje Państwowe S.A.
- Platforms: 1

Construction
- Structure type: Building: Pulled down Depot: Never existed Water tower: Never existed

History
- Former names: Königsried
Location

Łąg Południowy is a PKP railway station in Łąg (Pomeranian Voivodeship), Poland.

== Lines crossing the station ==
Start station	End station	Line type
Nowa Wieś Wielka	Gdynia Port Centralny	Passenger/Freight
