= Karolewo =

Karolewo may refer to:

- Karolewo, Bydgoszcz County in Kuyavian-Pomeranian Voivodeship (north-central Poland)
- Karolewo, Grudziądz County in Kuyavian-Pomeranian Voivodeship (north-central Poland)
- Karolewo, Sępólno County in Kuyavian-Pomeranian Voivodeship (north-central Poland)
- Karolewo, Maków County in Masovian Voivodeship (east-central Poland)
- Karolewo, Płock County in Masovian Voivodeship (east-central Poland)
- Karolewo, Sierpc County in Masovian Voivodeship (east-central Poland)
- Karolewo, Oborniki County in Greater Poland Voivodeship (west-central Poland)
- Karolewo, Piła County in Greater Poland Voivodeship (west-central Poland)
- Karolewo, Gmina Ostroróg in Greater Poland Voivodeship (west-central Poland)
- Karolewo, Gmina Wronki in Greater Poland Voivodeship (west-central Poland)
- Karolewo, Gmina Dominowo, Środa County in Greater Poland Voivodeship (west-central Poland)
- Karolewo, Złotów County in Greater Poland Voivodeship (west-central Poland)
- Karolewo, Lubusz Voivodeship (west Poland)
- Karolewo, Gmina Chojnice in Pomeranian Voivodeship (north Poland)
- Karolewo, Chojnice County in Pomeranian Voivodeship (north Poland)
- Karolewo, Kwidzyn County in Pomeranian Voivodeship (north Poland)
- Karolewo, Starogard County in Pomeranian Voivodeship (north Poland)
- Karolewo, Iława County in Warmian-Masurian Voivodeship (north Poland)
- Karolewo, Kętrzyn County in Warmian-Masurian Voivodeship (north Poland)
