= Wandowo =

Wandowo may refer to the following places:

- Wandowo, Greater Poland Voivodeship (west-central Poland)
- Wandowo, Kuyavian-Pomeranian Voivodeship (north-central Poland)
- Wandowo, Chojnice County in Pomeranian Voivodeship (north Poland)
- Wandowo, Kwidzyn County in Pomeranian Voivodeship (north Poland)
