= Gdynia Rzeźnia railway station =

Railway station in Gdynia, Poland

Coordinates: 54°33′12.7″N 18°28′3″E

Gdynia Rzeźnia
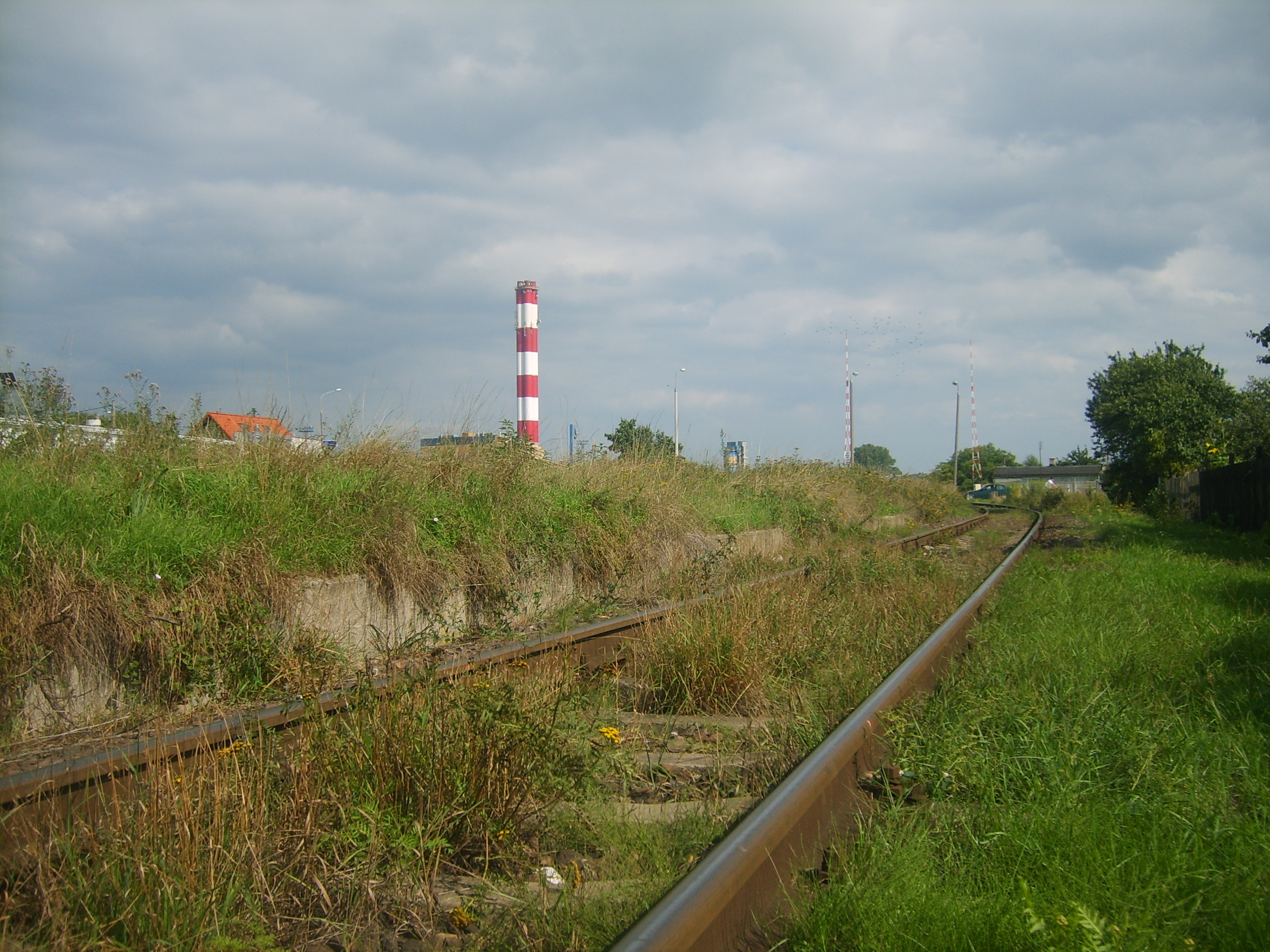

General information
- Location: Chylonia, Gdynia; Poland
- Owner: Polskie Koleje Państwowe S.A.
- Platforms: None

Construction
- Structure type: Building: Never existed Depot: Never existed Water tower: Never existed
Location

Gdynia Rzeźnia is a no longer operating PKP railway station in Gdynia (Pomeranian Voivodeship), Poland.

== Lines crossing the station ==
Start station	End station	Line type
Gdynia Port Centralny	Gdynia Chylonia	Freight
