= Zapora, Pomeranian Voivodeship =

Zapora
- Village
- Location within Poland
- Coordinates: 53°46′33″N 17°42′58″E
- Country: Poland
- Voivodeship: Pomeranian
- County: Chojnice
- Gmina: Czersk
- Population: 133

Zapora [zaˈpɔra] (formerly Mylof) is a village in the administrative district of Gmina Czersk, within Chojnice County, Pomeranian Voivodeship, in northern Poland. On January 29, 1951, the name Mylof was officially changed to Zapora.

For details of the history of the region, see History of Pomerania.
