= Bagna, Pomeranian Voivodeship =

Bagna
- Settlement
- Location within Poland
- Coordinates: 53°43′37″N 18°0′31″E
- Country: Poland
- Voivodeship: Pomeranian
- County: Chojnice
- Gmina: Czersk
- Population: 22

Bagna [ˈbaɡna] is a settlement in the administrative district of Gmina Czersk, within Chojnice County, Pomeranian Voivodeship, in northern Poland.

For details of the history of the region, see History of Pomerania.
