= Bukowa Góra, Chojnice County =

Bukowa Góra
- Settlement
- Location within Poland
- Coordinates: 53°48′45″N 18°4′30″E
- Country: Poland
- Voivodeship: Pomeranian
- County: Chojnice
- Gmina: Czersk
- Population: 55

Bukowa Góra ([buˈkɔva ˈɡura]; German: Bukowagora, 1942–45 Buchenberg) is a settlement in the administrative district of Gmina Czersk, within Chojnice County, Pomeranian Voivodeship, in northern Poland.

For details of the history of the region, see History of Pomerania.
