= Modrzejewo, Chojnice County =

Modrzejewo
- Settlement
- Location within Poland
- Coordinates: 53°45′48″N 17°45′11″E
- Country: Poland
- Voivodeship: Pomeranian
- County: Chojnice
- Gmina: Czersk

Modrzejewo [mɔdʐɛˈjɛvɔ] is a settlement in the administrative district of Gmina Czersk, within Chojnice County, Pomeranian Voivodeship, in northern Poland.
