= Koślinka, Chojnice County =

Koślinka
- Settlement
- Location within Poland
- Coordinates: 53°47′6″N 18°4′9″E
- Country: Poland
- Voivodeship: Pomeranian
- County: Chojnice
- Gmina: Czersk

Koślinka [kɔˈɕlinka] is a settlement in the administrative district of Gmina Czersk, within Chojnice County, Pomeranian Voivodeship, in northern Poland.

For details of the history of the region, see History of Pomerania.
