= Gmina Czersk =

Gmina Czersk Czersk Commune
- Gmina
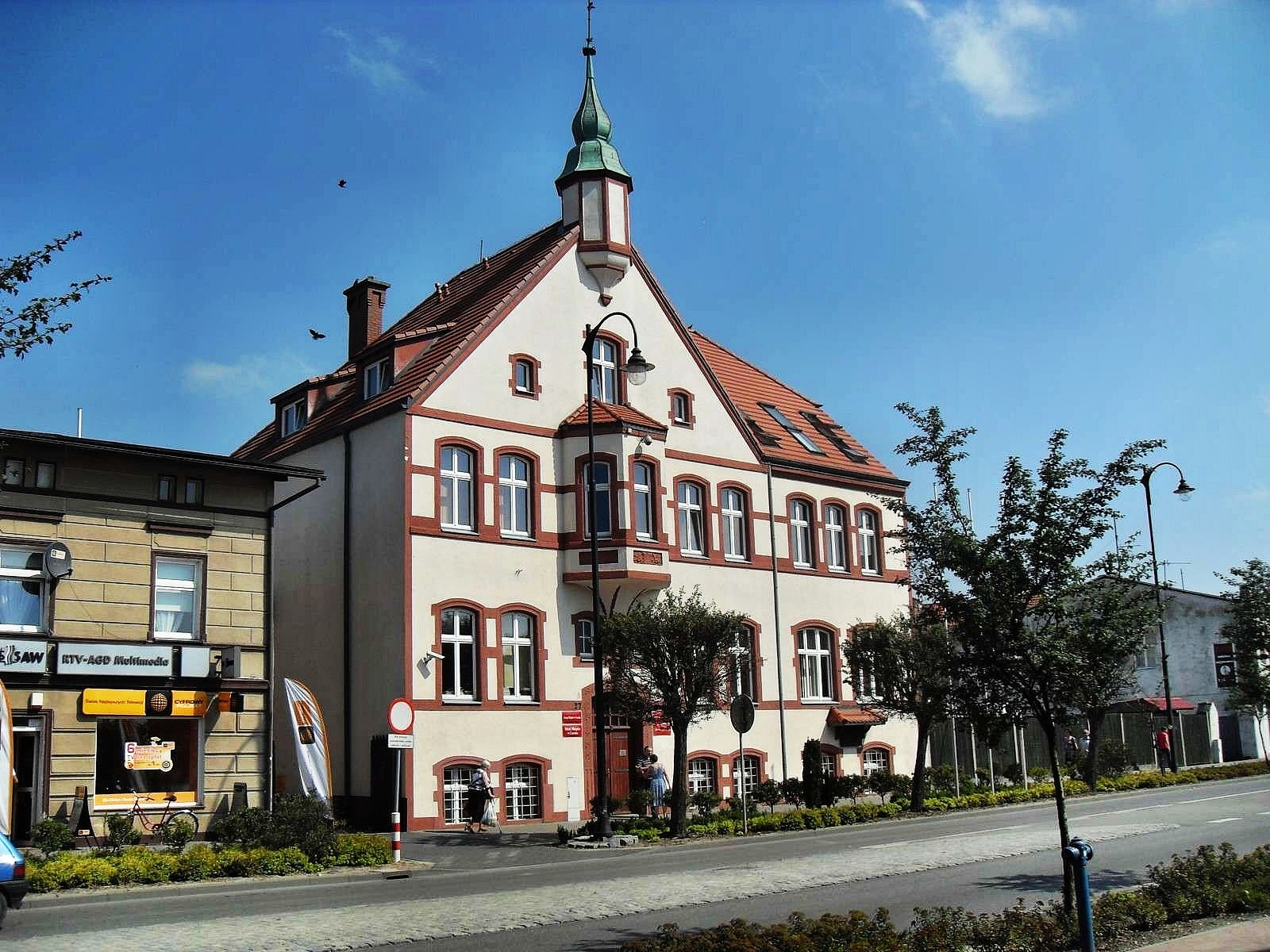
- Town Hall in Czersk, seat of the gmina office

- Flag Coat of arms
- Interactive map of Gmina Czersk
- Coordinates (Czersk): 53°47′34″N 17°58′26″E
- Country: Poland
- Voivodeship: Pomeranian
- County: Chojnice
- Seat: Czersk

Area
  - Total: 379.85 km^{2} (146.66 sq mi)

Population (2006)
  - Total: 20,548
  - Density: 54.095/km^{2} (140.11/sq mi)
  - Urban: 9,463
  - Rural: 11,085
- Time zone: UTC+1 (CET)
  - Summer (DST): UTC+2 (CEST)
- Vehicle registration: GCH
- Website: http://czersk.pl/

Gmina Czersk is an urban-rural gmina (administrative district) in Chojnice County, Pomeranian Voivodeship, in northern Poland. Its seat is the town of Czersk, which lies approximately 30 kilometres (19 mi) east of Chojnice and 77 km (48 mi) south-west of the regional capital Gdańsk.

The gmina covers an area of 379.85 square kilometres (146.7 sq mi), and as of 2006 its total population is 20,548 (out of which the population of Czersk amounts to 9,463, and the population of the rural part of the gmina is 11,085).

The gmina contains part of the protected area called Tuchola Landscape Park.

== Villages ==
Apart from the town of Czersk, Gmina Czersk contains the villages and settlements of:

- Badzianko
- Bagna
- Będźmierowice
- Bielawy
- Błoto
- Brda
- Budziska
- Bukowa Góra
- Cegielnia
- Czerska Struga
- Dąbki
- Duża Klonia
- Duże Wędoły
- Gartki
- Gotelp
- Gutowiec
- Jeziórko
- Kaliska
- Kameron
- Kamionka
- Karolewo
- Kęsza
- Klaskawa
- Kłodnia
- Klonowice
- Konewki
- Konigort
- Konigórtek
- Koślinka
- Kosowa Niwa
- Koszary
- Krzyż
- Kurcze
- Kurkowo
- Kwieki
- Łąg
- Łąg-Kolonia
- Lipki
- Listewka
- Łubna
- Łukowo
- Lutom
- Lutomski Most
- Mała Klonia
- Malachin
- Małe Wędoły
- Młynki
- Modrzejewo
- Mokre
- Mosna
- Nieżurawa
- Nowa Juńcza
- Nowe Prusy
- Nowy Młyn
- Odry
- Olszyny
- Ostrowite
- Ostrowy
- Płecno
- Pod Łąg
- Pod Łubnę
- Polana
- Przyjaźnia
- Pustki
- Rówki
- Rytel
- Rytel-Zarzecze
- Sienica
- Stara Juńcza
- Stare Prusy
- Stodółki
- Struga
- Suszek
- Szałamaje
- Szary Kierz
- Szyszkowiec
- Twarożnica
- Uboga
- Uroża
- Ustronie
- Wądoły-Łąg
- Wandowo
- Wędowo
- Wieck
- Wojtal
- Zapędowo
- Zapora
- Zawada
- Złe Mięso
- Złotowo
- Żukowo

== Neighbouring gminas ==
Gmina Czersk is bordered by the gminas of Brusy, Chojnice, Kaliska, Karsin, Osieczna, Śliwice, Stara Kiszewa and Tuchola.
