= Ostrowite, Bytów County =

Ostrowite
- Village
- Location within Poland
- Coordinates: 54°01′33″N 17°23′09″E
- Country: Poland
- Voivodeship: Pomeranian
- County: Bytów
- Gmina: Lipnica
- Population: 232

Ostrowite [ɔstrɔˈvitɛ] is a village in Gmina Lipnica, Bytów County, Pomeranian Voivodeship, in northern Poland.

From 1975 to 1998 the village was in Słupsk Voivodeship.
