= Lubné =

- Municipality
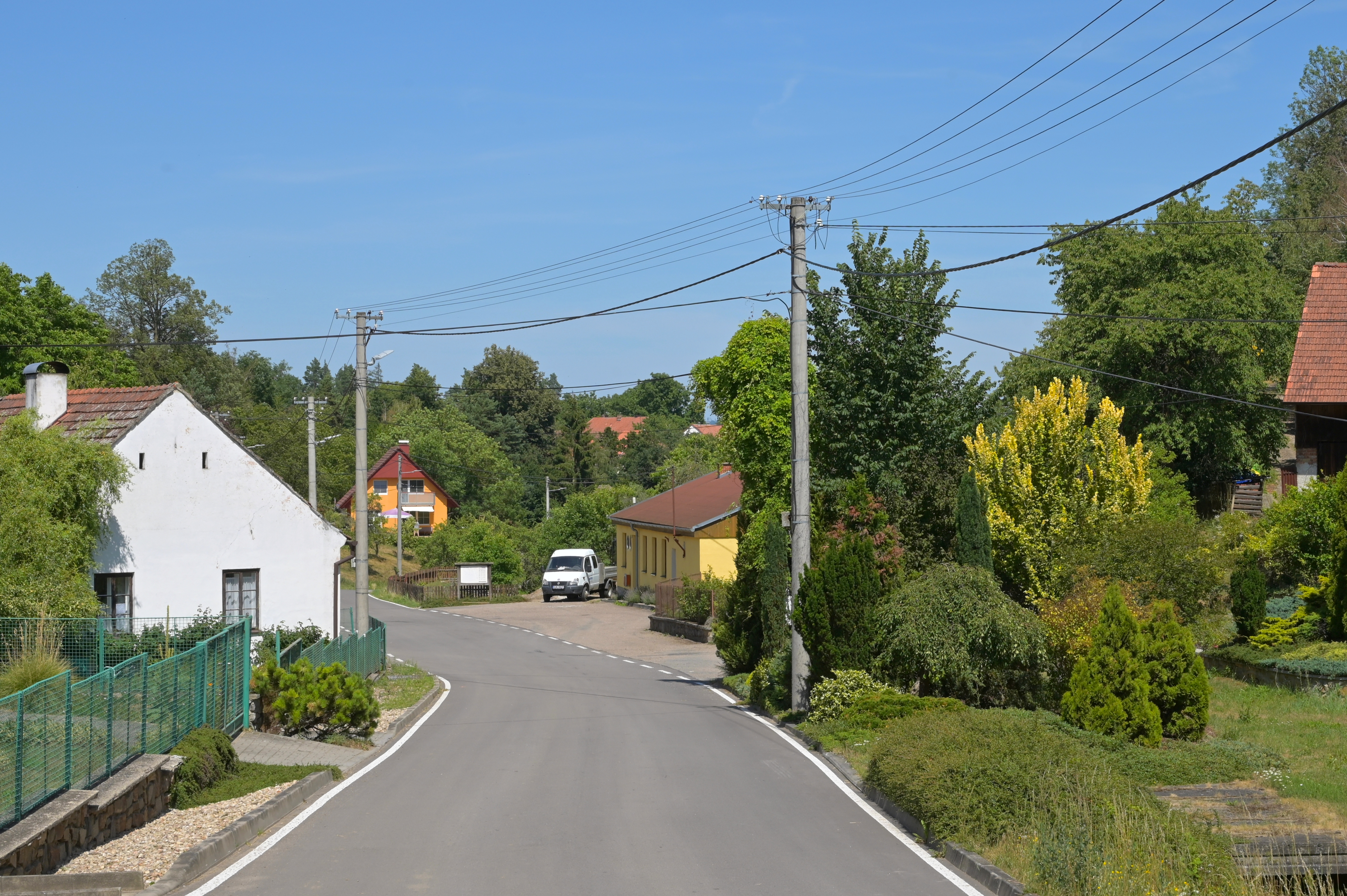
- Southern part of Lubné

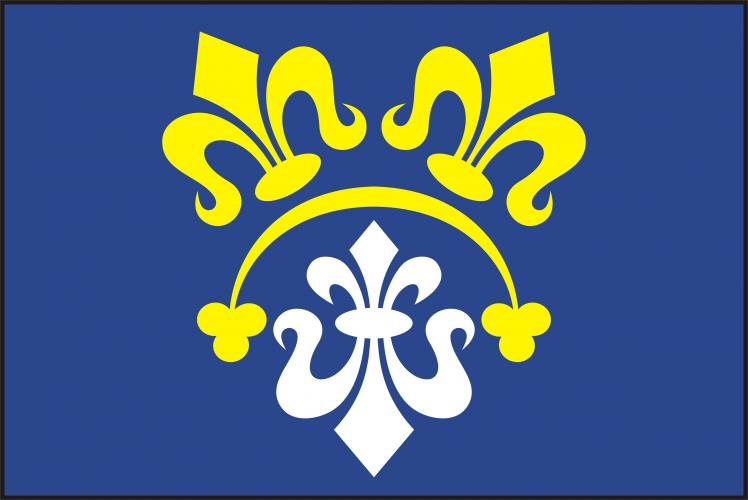
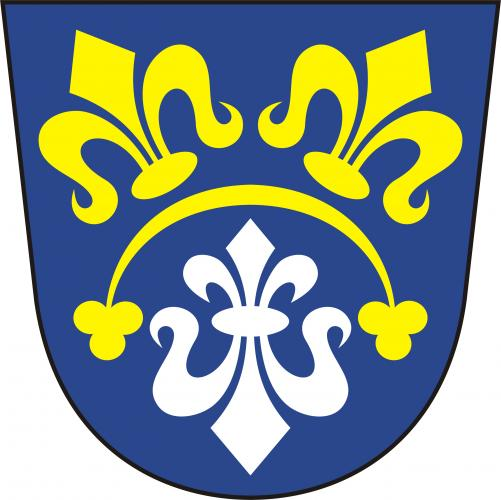
- Flag Coat of arms

- Location in the Czech Republic
- Coordinates: 49°21′15″N 16°16′31″E
- Country: Czech Republic
- Region: South Moravian
- District: Brno-Country
- First mentioned: 1360

Area
  - Total: 3.02 km^{2} (1.17 sq mi)
- Elevation: 448 m (1,470 ft)

Population (2026-01-01)
  - Total: 53
  - Density: 18/km^{2} (45/sq mi)
- Time zone: UTC+1 (CET)
  - Summer (DST): UTC+2 (CEST)
- Postal code: 594 51
- Website: www.lubne.cz

Lubné is a municipality and village in Brno-Country District in the South Moravian Region of the Czech Republic. It has about 50 inhabitants.

Lubné lies approximately 31 kilometres (19 mi) north-west of Brno and 157 km (98 mi) south-east of Prague.

== Demographics ==
Historical population
| Year | Pop. | ±% |
|---|---|---|
| 1869 | 132 | — |
| 1880 | 169 | +28.0% |
| 1890 | 165 | −2.4% |
| 1900 | 155 | −6.1% |
| 1910 | 160 | +3.2% |
| 1921 | 169 | +5.6% |
| 1930 | 144 | −14.8% |
| 1950 | 122 | −15.3% |
| 1961 | 118 | −3.3% |
| 1970 | 100 | −15.3% |
| 1980 | 74 | −26.0% |
| 1991 | 65 | −12.2% |
| 2001 | 54 | −16.9% |
| 2011 | 52 | −3.7% |
| 2021 | 50 | −3.8% |
Source: Censuses
