= Modrzejewo, Gmina Lipnica =

Modrzejewo
- Village
- Location within Poland
- Coordinates: 54°0′53″N 17°31′53″E
- Country: Poland
- Voivodeship: Pomeranian
- County: Bytów
- Gmina: Lipnica
- Population: 4

Modrzejewo [mɔdʐɛˈjɛvɔ] is a village in the administrative district of Gmina Lipnica, within Bytów County, Pomeranian Voivodeship, in northern Poland.

For details of the history of the region, see History of Pomerania.
