= Gdynia Port Centralny railway station =

Railway station in Gdynia, Poland

Gdynia Port Centralny
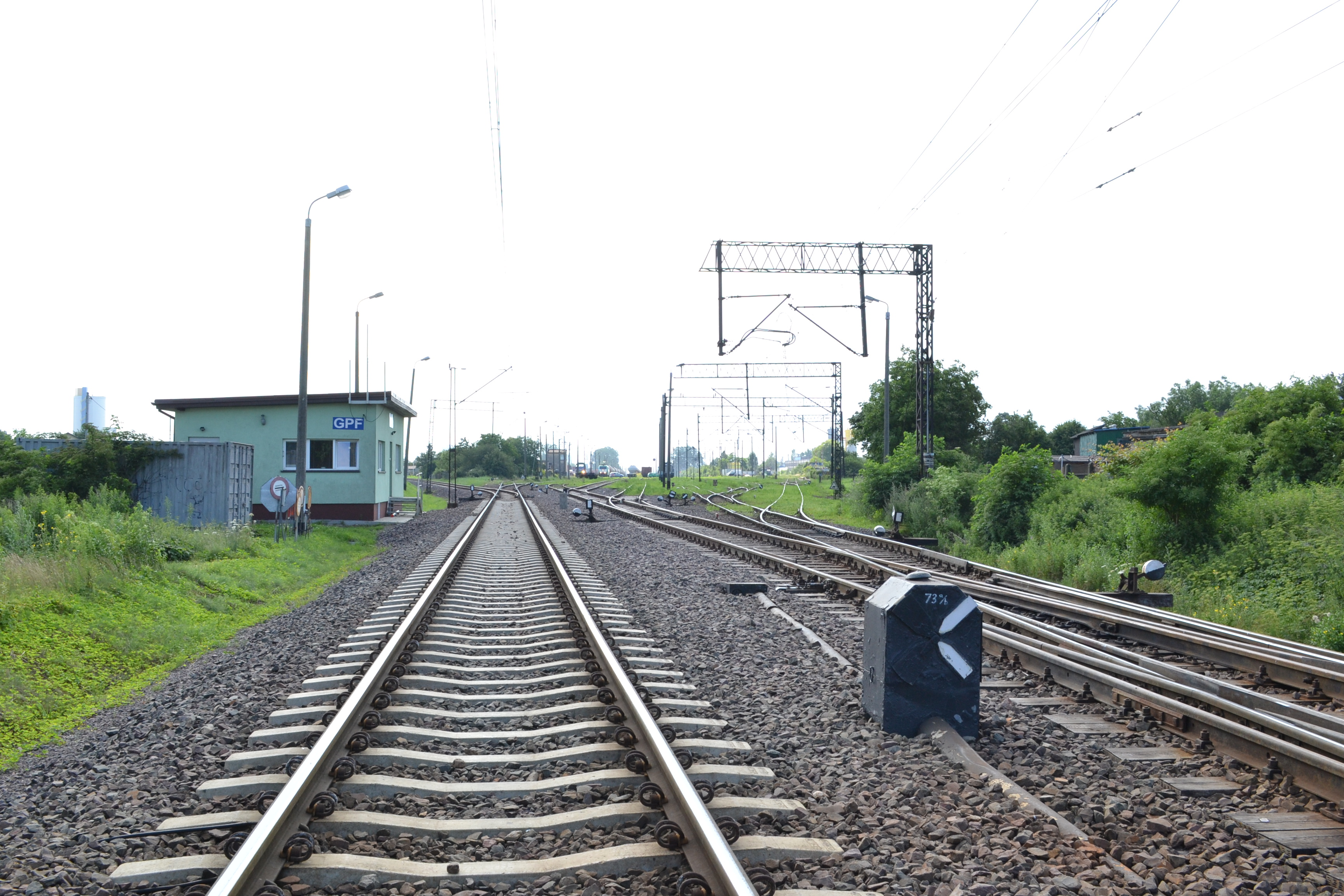

General information
- Location: Chylonia, Gdynia; Poland
- Coordinates: 54.6°N 18.5°E
- Owner: Polskie Koleje Państwowe S.A.
- Platforms: None

Construction
- Structure type: Building: Yes; Depot: Never existed Water tower: Never existed
Location
- Location within Pomeranian Voivodeship Location within Poland

Gdynia Port Centralny is a PKP freight railway station in Gdynia (Pomeranian Voivodeship), Poland.

== Lines crossing the station ==
Start station	End station	Line type
Gdynia Port Centralny	Gdynia Chylonia	Freight
Gmina Nowa Wieś Wielka	Gdynia Port Centralny	Freight
Rumia	Gdynia Port Oksywie	Freight
