= Chojnice County =

Chojnice County Powiat chojnicki
- County
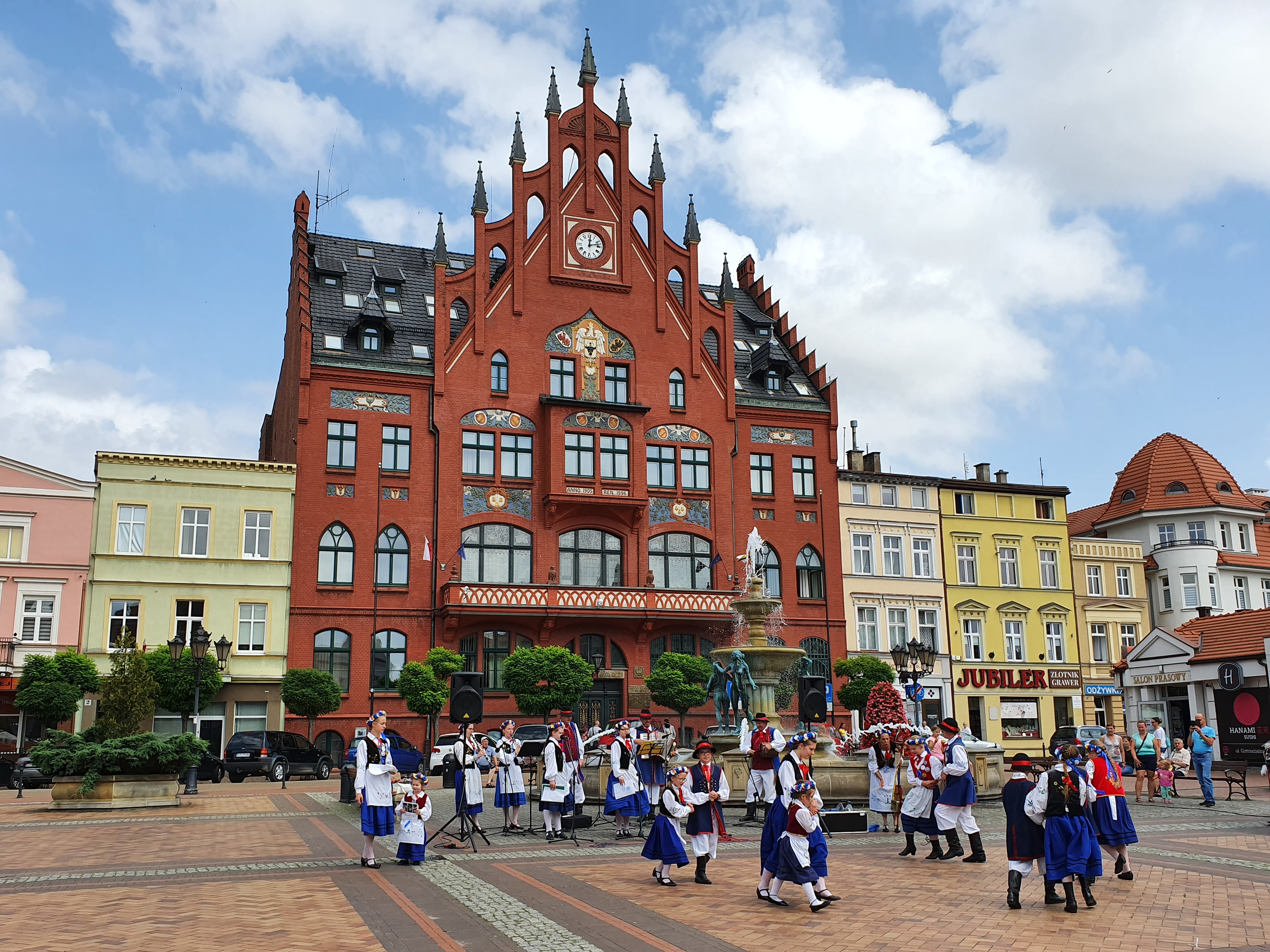
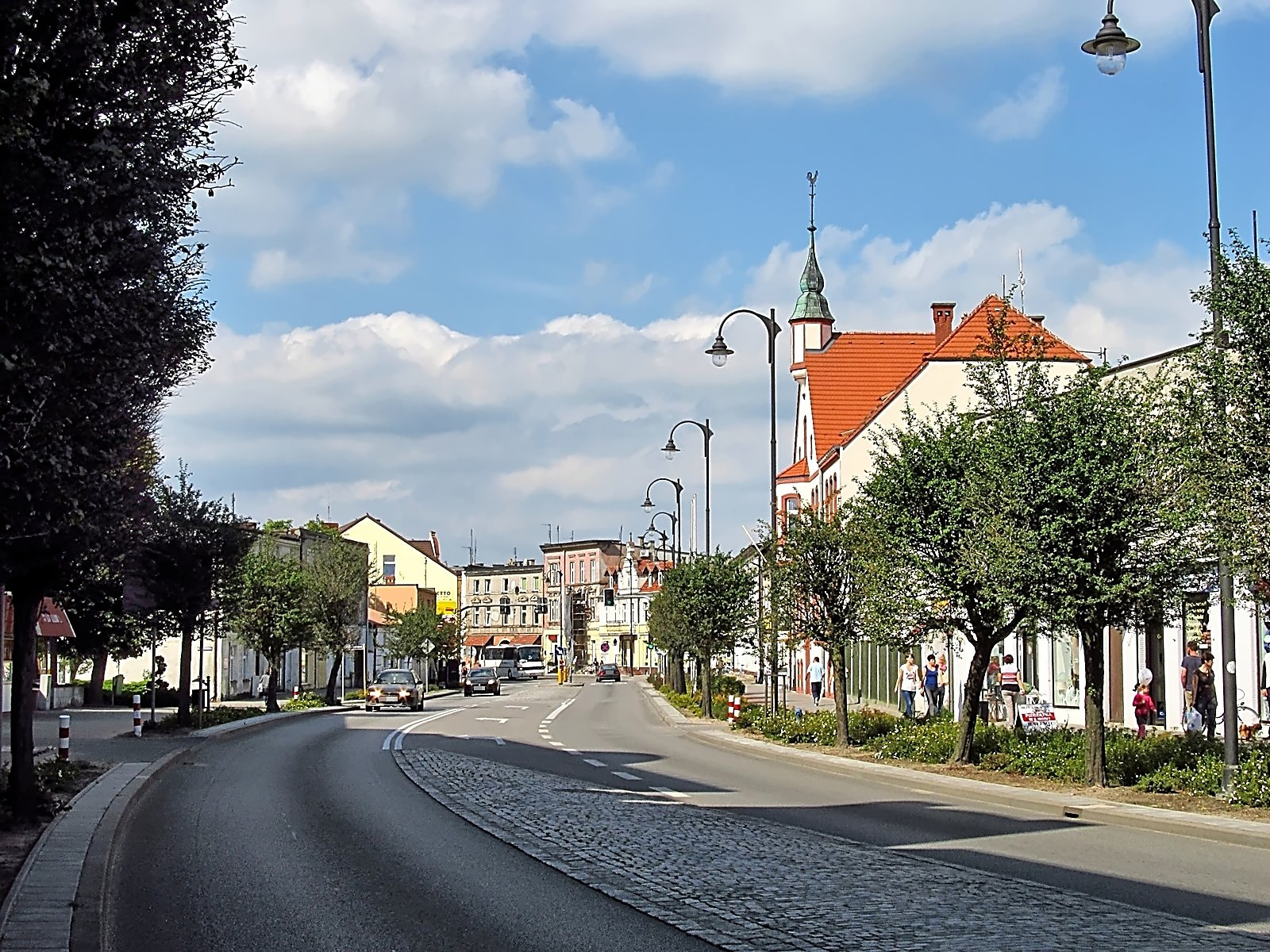
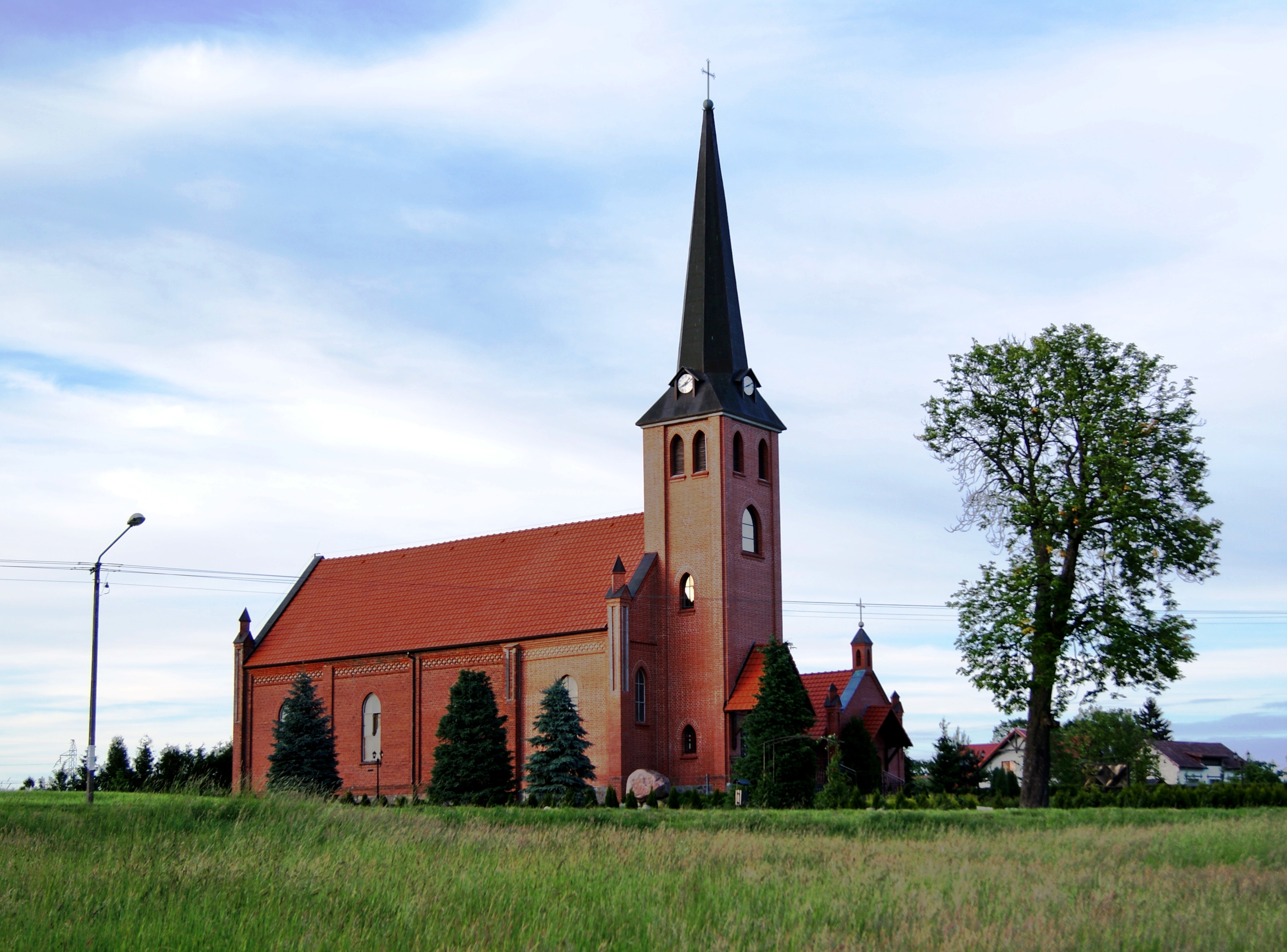
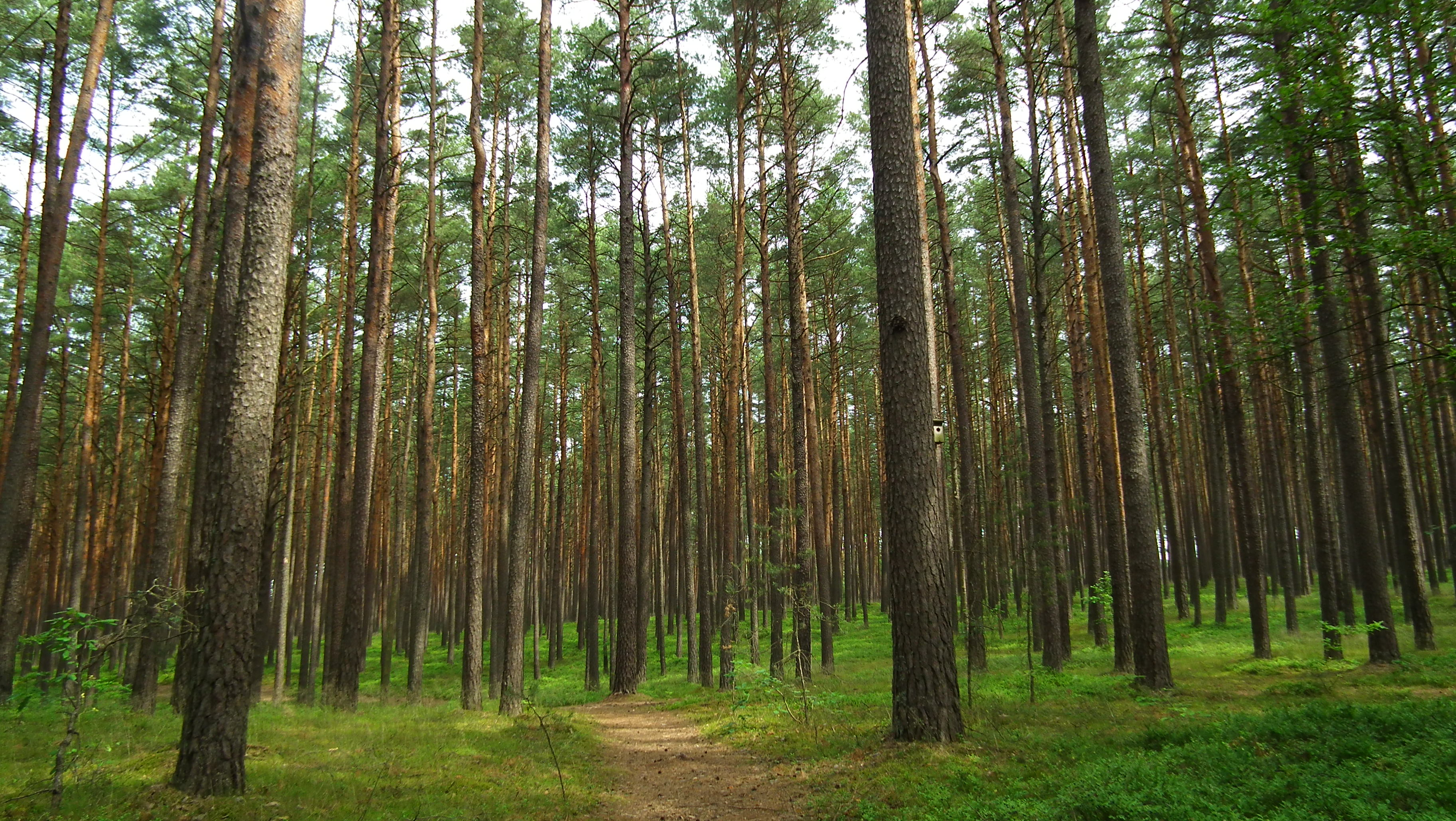
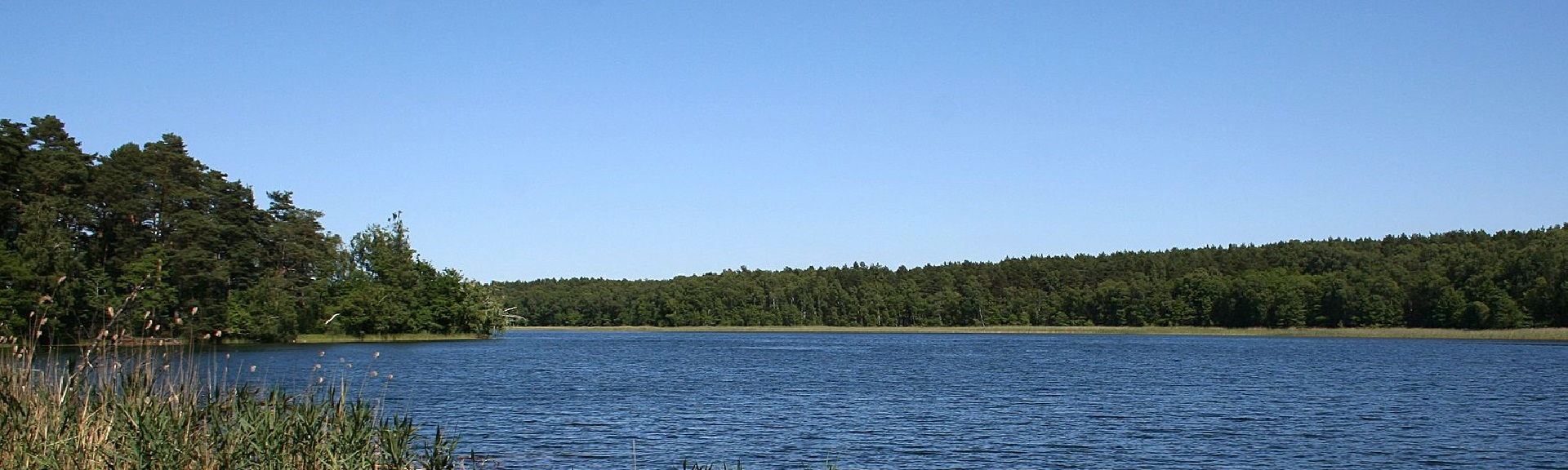
- Market Square in Chojnice Kościuszki Street in Czersk Church in Krojanty Tuchola Forest Ostrowite Lake

- Flag Coat of arms

- Coordinates (Chojnice): 53°42′N 17°33′E
- Country: Poland
- Voivodeship: Pomeranian
- Seat: Chojnice
- Gminas: Total 5 (incl. 1 urban): Chojnice; Gmina Brusy; Gmina Chojnice; Gmina Czersk; Gmina Konarzyny

Area
  - Total: 1,364.25 km^{2} (526.74 sq mi)

Population (2019)
  - Total: 97,616
  - Density: 71.553/km^{2} (185.32/sq mi)
  - Urban: 54,988
  - Rural: 42,628
- Time zone: UTC+1 (CET)
  - Summer (DST): UTC+2 (CEST)
- Car plates: GCH
- Website: powiat.chojnice.pl

Chojnice County (Polish: powiat chojnicki, Kashubian: Chòniczzi kréz) is a unit of territorial administration and local government (powiat) in Pomeranian Voivodeship, northern Poland. It came into being on January 1, 1999, as a result of the Polish local government reforms in 1998. Its administrative seat and largest town is Chojnice, which lies 103 kilometres (64 mi) south-west of the regional capital Gdańsk. The county also contains the towns of Czersk, lying 30 km (19 mi) east of Chojnice, and Brusy, 24 km (15 mi) north-east of Chojnice.

The county covers an area of 1,364.25 square kilometres (526.7 sq mi). As of 2019 its total population is 97,616, out of which the population of Chojnice is 39,890, that of Czersk is 9,910, that of Brusy is 5,188, and the rural population is 42,628.

Chojnice County on a map of the counties of Pomeranian Voivodeship

Chojnice County is bordered by Bytów County and Kościerzyna County to the north, Starogard County and Tuchola County to the east, Sępólno County to the south, and Człuchów County to the west.

== Administrative divisions ==
The county is subdivided into five gminas (one urban, two urban-rural and two rural). These are listed in the following table, in descending order of population.

Gmina	Type	Area (km^{2})	Population (2019)	Seat
Chojnice	urban	21.1	39,890	
Gmina Czersk	urban-rural	379.9	21,643	Czersk
Gmina Chojnice	rural	458.3	19,195	Chojnice *
Gmina Brusy	urban-rural	400.7	14,572	Brusy
Gmina Konarzyny	rural	104.3	2,316	Konarzyny
* seat not part of the gmina

== Culture ==
=== Monuments ===
On the list of the National Heritage Institute there are 54 objects from Chojnie County.

Referring to Voivodship Register of Monuments, there are over 808 objects located in the county. Most historical buildings are located in the commune of Chojnice - 294 items, and the least in the commune of Konarzyny - 41.
