= Śluza =

Śluza may refer to the following places:

- Śluza, Chojnice County in Pomeranian Voivodeship (north Poland)
- Śluza, Kościerzyna County in Pomeranian Voivodeship (north Poland)
- Śluza, Warmian-Masurian Voivodeship (north Poland)
