= Stary Młyn =

Stary Młyn may refer to the following places:

- Stary Młyn, Greater Poland Voivodeship (west-central Poland)
- Stary Młyn, Masovian Voivodeship (east-central Poland)
- Stary Młyn, Chojnice County in Pomeranian Voivodeship (north Poland)
- Stary Młyn, Kwidzyn County in Pomeranian Voivodeship (north Poland)
- Stary Młyn, Tczew County in Pomeranian Voivodeship (north Poland)
