= Kłodawa (disambiguation) =

Kłodawa may refer to the following places:

- Kłodawa in Greater Poland Voivodeship (west-central Poland)
- Kłodawa, Lubusz Voivodeship (west Poland)
- Kłodawa, Subcarpathian Voivodeship (south-east Poland)
- Kłodawa, Chojnice County in Pomeranian Voivodeship (north Poland)
- Kłodawa, Gdańsk County in Pomeranian Voivodeship (north Poland)
