= Granowo =

Granowo may refer to the following villages in Poland:

- Granowo, Greater Poland Voivodeship
- Granowo, Pomeranian Voivodeship
- Granowo, West Pomeranian Voivodeship

== See also ==
- Granówko
