= Pawłówko =

Pawłówko may refer to the following places in Poland:

- Pawłówko, Gmina Wielichowo, Grodzisk County in Greater Poland Voivodeship (west-central Poland)
- Pawłówko, Gmina Buk in Greater Poland Voivodeship (west-central Poland)
- Pawłówko, Ciechanów County in Masovian Voivodeship (east-central Poland)
- Pawłówko, Przasnysz County in Masovian Voivodeship (east-central Poland)
- Pawłówko, Chojnice County in Pomeranian Voivodeship (north Poland)
- Pawłówko, Człuchów County in Pomeranian Voivodeship (north Poland)
