= Strużka =

Strużka may refer to the following places:

- Strużka, Greater Poland Voivodeship (west-central Poland)
- Strużka, Lubusz Voivodeship (west Poland)
- Strużka, Chojnice County in Pomeranian Voivodeship (north Poland)
- Strużka, Człuchów County in Pomeranian Voivodeship (north Poland)
