= Plesno =

Plesno may refer to the following places:

- Pleśno, Lubusz Voivodeship (west Poland)
- Pleśno, Bartoszyce County in Warmian-Masurian Voivodeship (north Poland)
- Pleśno, Ostróda County in Warmian-Masurian Voivodeship (north Poland)
- Płęsno, Pomeranian Voivodeship (north Poland)
