= Białe Błota, Pomeranian Voivodeship =

Białe Błota
- Settlement
- Location within Poland
- Coordinates: 53°41′44″N 17°45′40″E
- Country: Poland
- Voivodeship: Pomeranian
- County: Chojnice
- Gmina: Chojnice
- Time zone: UTC+1 (CET)
  - Summer (DST): UTC+2 (CEST)
- Vehicle registration: GCH

Białe Błota [ˈbjawɛ ˈbwɔta] is a settlement in the administrative district of Gmina Chojnice, within Chojnice County, Pomeranian Voivodeship, in northern Poland. It is located within the historic region of Pomerania.
