= Wielkie Zanie =

- Village
- Location within Poland
- Coordinates: 53°52′57″N 17°27′58″E
- Country: Poland
- Voivodeship: Pomeranian
- County: Chojnice
- Gmina: Chojnice
- Population: 131

Wielkie Zanie [ˈvjɛlkʲɛ ˈzaɲɛ] is a village in the administrative district of Gmina Chojnice, within Chojnice County, Pomeranian Voivodeship, in northern Poland.

For details of the history of the region, see History of Pomerania.
