= Nowa Cerkiew, Chojnice County =

Nowa Cerkiew
- Village
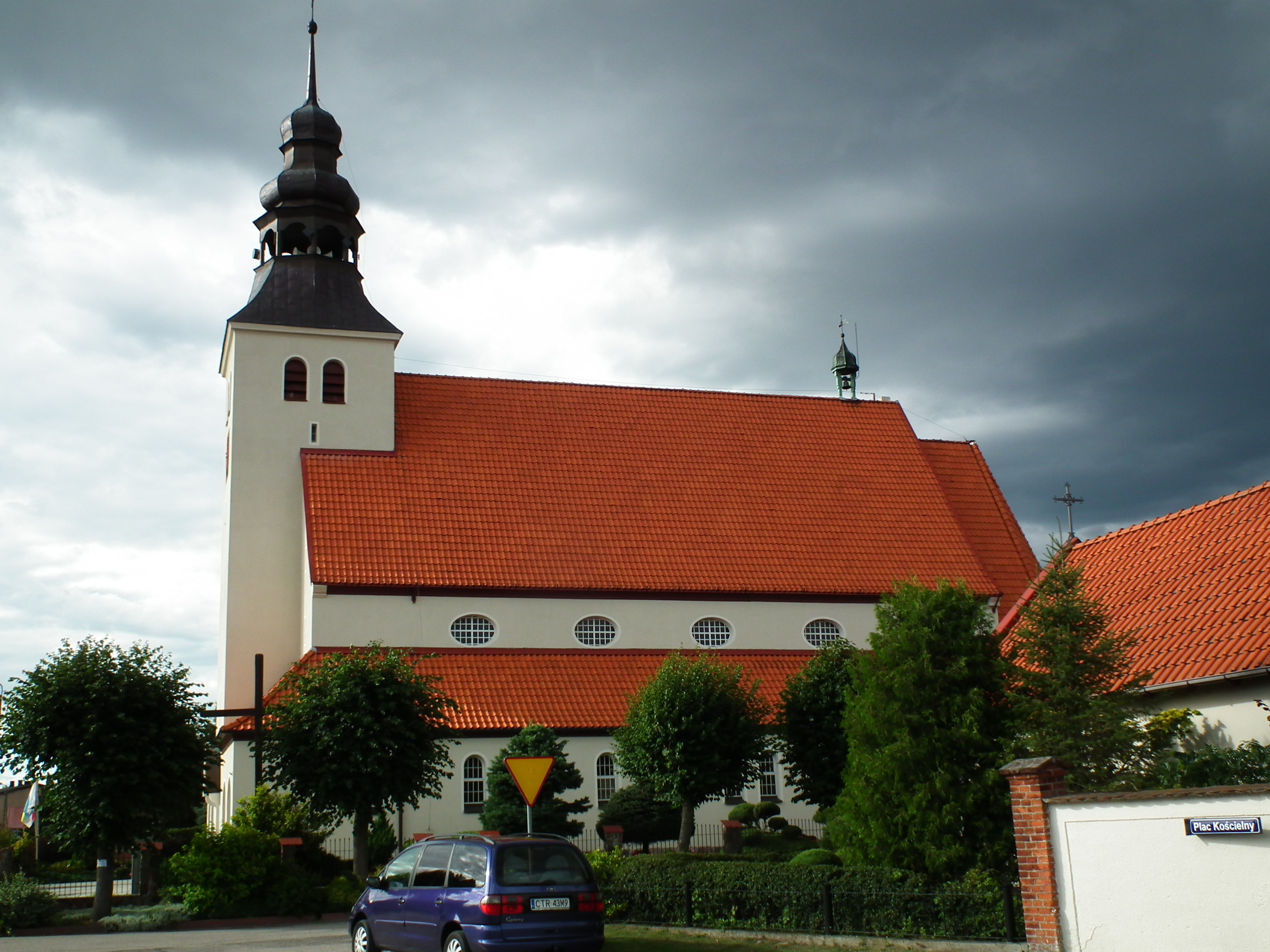
- Mary Magdalene church in Nowa Cerkiew

- Location within Poland
- Coordinates: 53°41′59″N 17°41′7″E
- Country: Poland
- Voivodeship: Pomeranian
- County: Chojnice
- Gmina: Chojnice
- Population: 592
- Time zone: UTC+1 (CET)
  - Summer (DST): UTC+2 (CEST)
- Vehicle registration: GCH

Nowa Cerkiew [ˈnɔva ˈt͡sɛrkʲɛf] is a village in the administrative district of Gmina Chojnice, within Chojnice County, Pomeranian Voivodeship, in northern Poland. It is located within the historic region of Pomerania.

== History ==
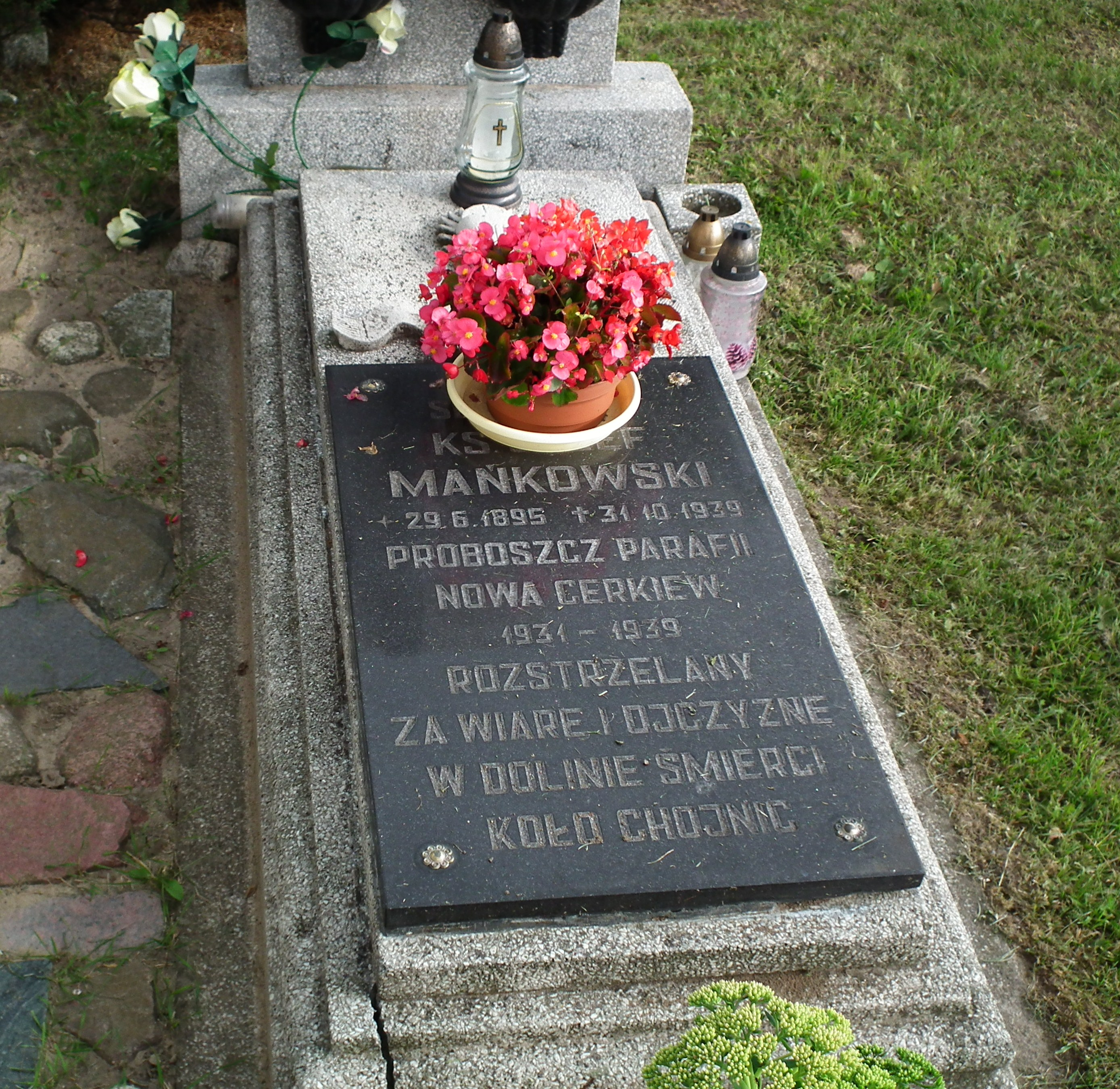
Grave of priest Józef Mańkowski

Nowa Cerkiew was a royal village of the Polish Crown, administratively located in the Człuchów County in the Pomeranian Voivodeship.

During the German occupation of Poland (World War II), the local Polish parish priest Józef Mańkowski was arrested and then murdered by the Germans in a mass execution of Poles carried out in November 1939 in the so-called Valley of Death near Chojnice (see Intelligenzaktion).
