= Kopernica, Poland =

Kopernica
- Village
- Location within Poland
- Coordinates: 53°47′15″N 17°28′41″E
- Country: Poland
- Voivodeship: Pomeranian
- County: Chojnice
- Gmina: Chojnice
- Population: 54

Kopernica [kɔpɛrˈnit͡sa] is a village in the administrative district of Gmina Chojnice, within Chojnice County, Pomeranian Voivodeship, in northern Poland.

For details of the history of the region, see History of Pomerania. The village forms a sołectwo (village administrative unit) within the Gmina Chojnice. The sołectwo comprises the localities of Babilon and Borne. At the end of 2024, the sołectwo had 55 inhabitants.
