= Kopernica nad Jeziorem =

- Settlement
- Location within Poland
- Coordinates: 53°47′59″N 17°28′57″E
- Country: Poland
- Voivodeship: Pomeranian
- County: Chojnice
- Gmina: Chojnice

Kopernica nad Jeziorem [kɔpɛrˈnit͡sa ˌnad jɛˈʑɔrɛm] is a settlement in the administrative district of Gmina Chojnice, within Chojnice County, Pomeranian Voivodeship, in northern Poland.

For details of the history of the region, see History of Pomerania.
