= Zbrzyca, Chojnice County =

Zbrzyca
- Village
- Location within Poland
- Coordinates: 53°52′57″N 17°28′46″E
- Country: Poland
- Voivodeship: Pomeranian
- County: Chojnice
- Gmina: Chojnice
- Population: 83

Zbrzyca [ˈzbʐɨt͡sa] is a village in the administrative district of Gmina Chojnice, within Chojnice County, Pomeranian Voivodeship, in northern Poland.

For details of the history of the region, see History of Pomerania.
