= Sternowo =

- Village
- Location within Poland
- Coordinates: 53°41′55″N 17°42′49″E
- Country: Poland
- Voivodeship: Pomeranian
- County: Chojnice
- Gmina: Chojnice
- Population: 129
- Time zone: UTC+1 (CET)
  - Summer (DST): UTC+2 (CEST)
- Vehicle registration: GCH

Sternowo [stɛrˈnɔvɔ] is a village in the administrative district of Gmina Chojnice, within Chojnice County, Pomeranian Voivodeship, in northern Poland.

== History ==
Sternowo was a private village of Polish nobility, including the Żabiński and Żukowski families, administratively located in the Człuchów County in the Pomeranian Voivodeship of the Kingdom of Poland.

During the German occupation of Poland (World War II), in 1940 and 1942, the occupiers carried out expulsions of Poles, who were deported either to the General Government in the more-eastern part of German-occupied Poland or to forced labour in Germany. Houses and farms of expelled Poles were handed over to German colonists as part of the Lebensraum policy.
