= Charzykowy =

- Village
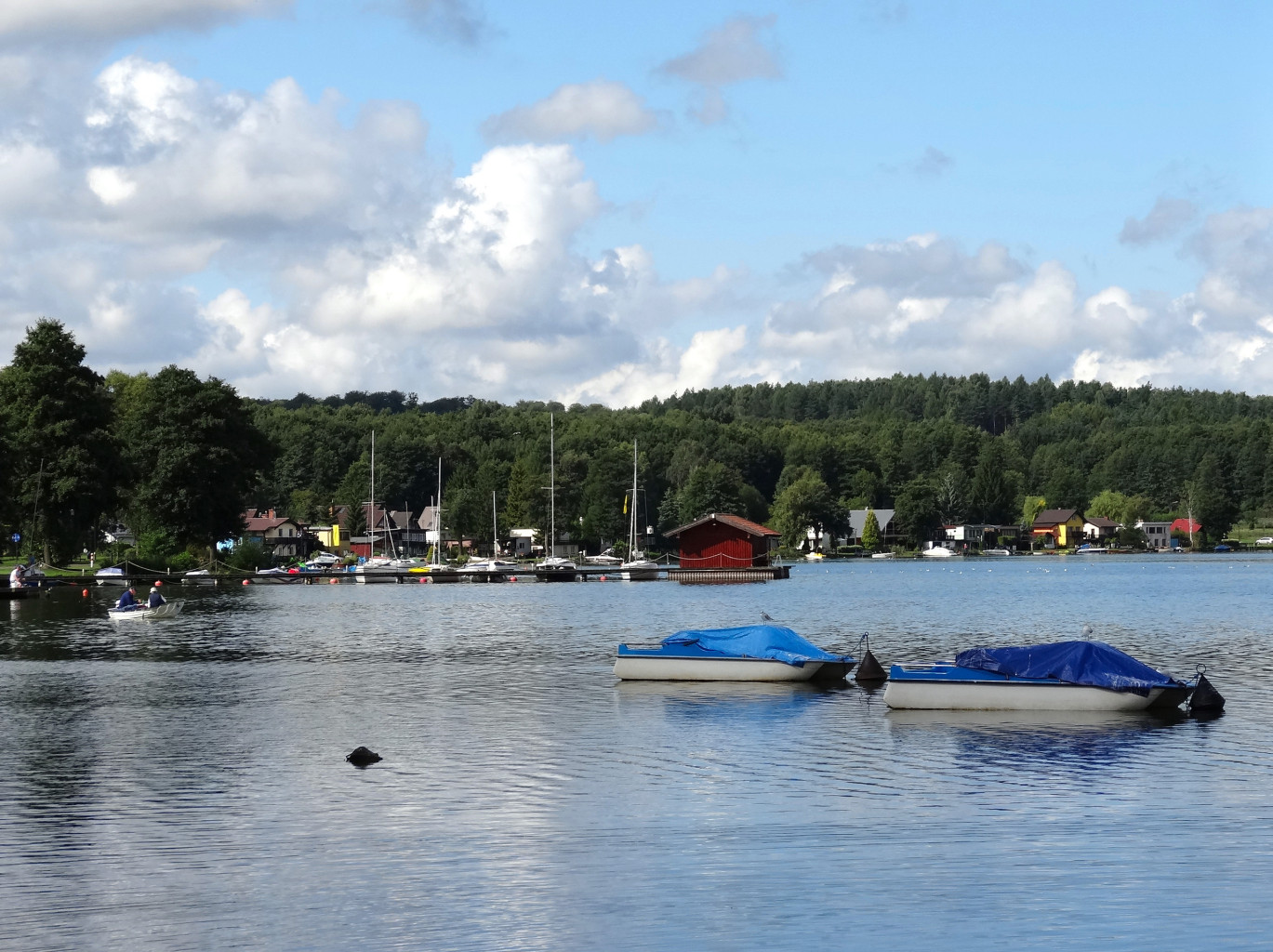
- Charzykowskie Lake

- Location within Poland
- Coordinates: 53°43′58″N 17°30′30″E
- Country: Poland
- Voivodeship: Pomeranian
- County: Chojnice
- Gmina: Chojnice
- Population: 2,047
- Time zone: UTC+1 (CET)
  - Summer (DST): UTC+2 (CEST)

Charzykowy [xaʐɨˈkɔvɨ] is a village in the administrative district of Gmina Chojnice, within Chojnice County, Pomeranian Voivodeship, in northern Poland. It is located within the historic region of Pomerania.

Charzykowy was a royal village of the Polish Crown, administratively located in the Człuchów County in the Pomeranian Voivodeship.
