= Ciechocin, Pomeranian Voivodeship =

Ciechocin
- Village
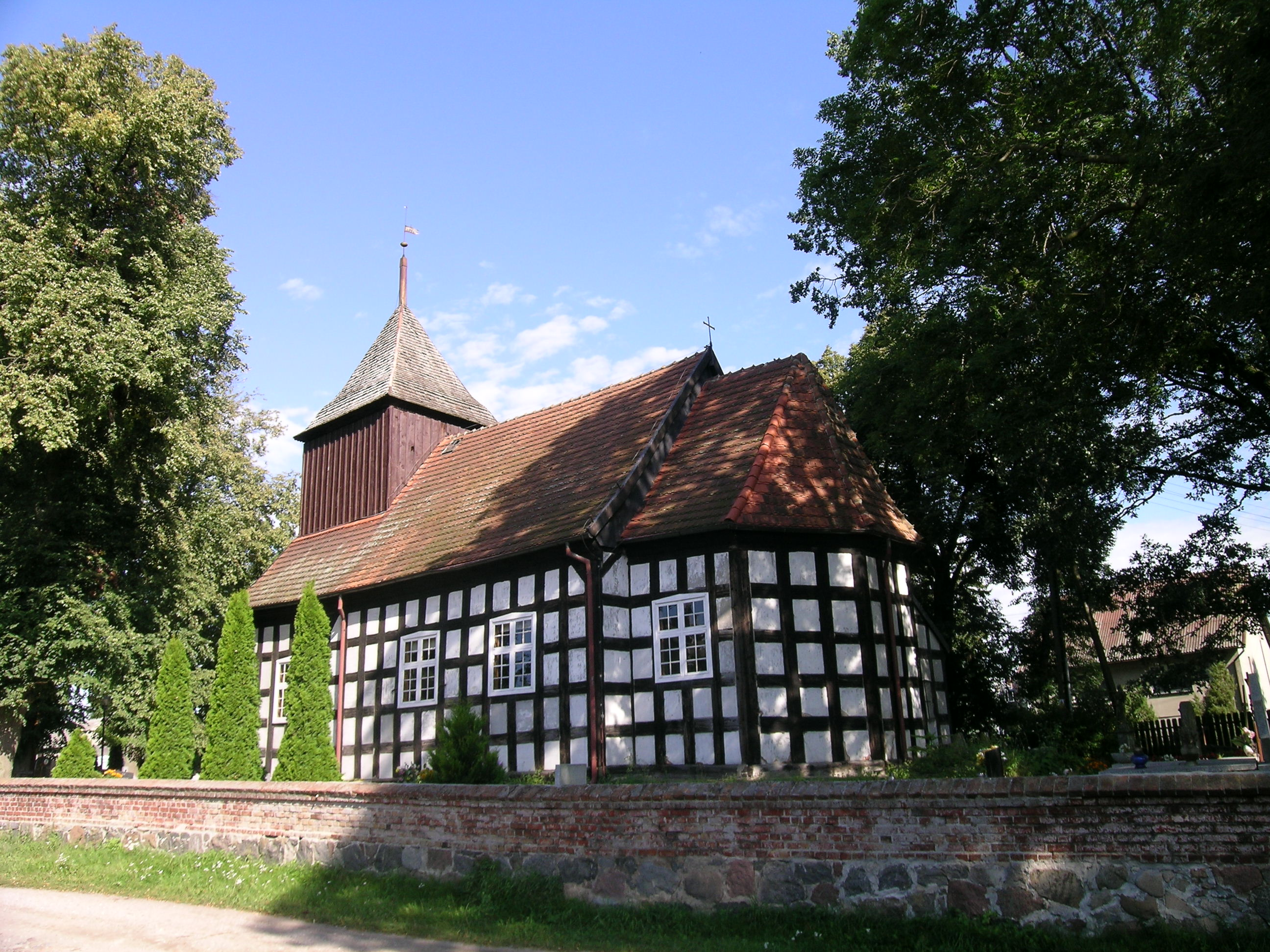
- St. Marcin church in Ciechocin

- Location within Poland
- Coordinates: 53°36′46″N 17°41′54″E
- Country: Poland
- Voivodeship: Pomeranian
- County: Chojnice
- Gmina: Chojnice
- Population: 521
- Time zone: UTC+1 (CET)
  - Summer (DST): UTC+2 (CEST)
- Vehicle registration: GCH

Ciechocin [t͡ɕɛˈxɔt͡ɕin] is a village in the administrative district of Gmina Chojnice, within Chojnice County, Pomeranian Voivodeship, in northern Poland. It is located within the historic region of Pomerania.

The village had a population of 448 in 2021.

Ciechocin was a royal village of the Polish Crown, administratively located in the Tuchola County in the Pomeranian Voivodeship.
