= Chojniczki-Wybudowanie =

- Settlement
- Location within Poland
- Coordinates: 53°43′25″N 17°33′6″E
- Country: Poland
- Voivodeship: Pomeranian
- County: Chojnice
- Gmina: Chojnice

Chojniczki-Wybudowanie [xɔi̯ˈnit͡ʂki vɨbudɔˈvaɲɛ] is a settlement in the administrative district of Gmina Chojnice, within Chojnice County, Pomeranian Voivodeship, in northern Poland.

For details of the history of the region, see History of Pomerania.
