= Jabłuszek Duży =

- Village
- Location within Poland
- Coordinates: 54°3′37″N 17°40′25″E
- Country: Poland
- Voivodeship: Pomeranian
- County: Kościerzyna
- Gmina: Lipusz
- Population: 4

Jabłuszek Duży [jaˈbwuʂɛk ˈduʐɨ] is a village in the administrative district of Gmina Lipusz, within Kościerzyna County, Pomeranian Voivodeship, in northern Poland.

For details of the history of the region, see History of Pomerania.
