= Krosewo =

- Settlement
- Location within Poland
- Coordinates: 54°3′32″N 17°46′32″E
- Country: Poland
- Voivodeship: Pomeranian
- County: Kościerzyna
- Gmina: Lipusz
- Population: 27

Krosewo [krɔˈsɛvɔ] is a settlement in the administrative district of Gmina Lipusz, within Kościerzyna County, Pomeranian Voivodeship, in northern Poland.

For details of the history of the region, see History of Pomerania.
