= Lichnowy, Chojnice County =

Lichnowy
- Village
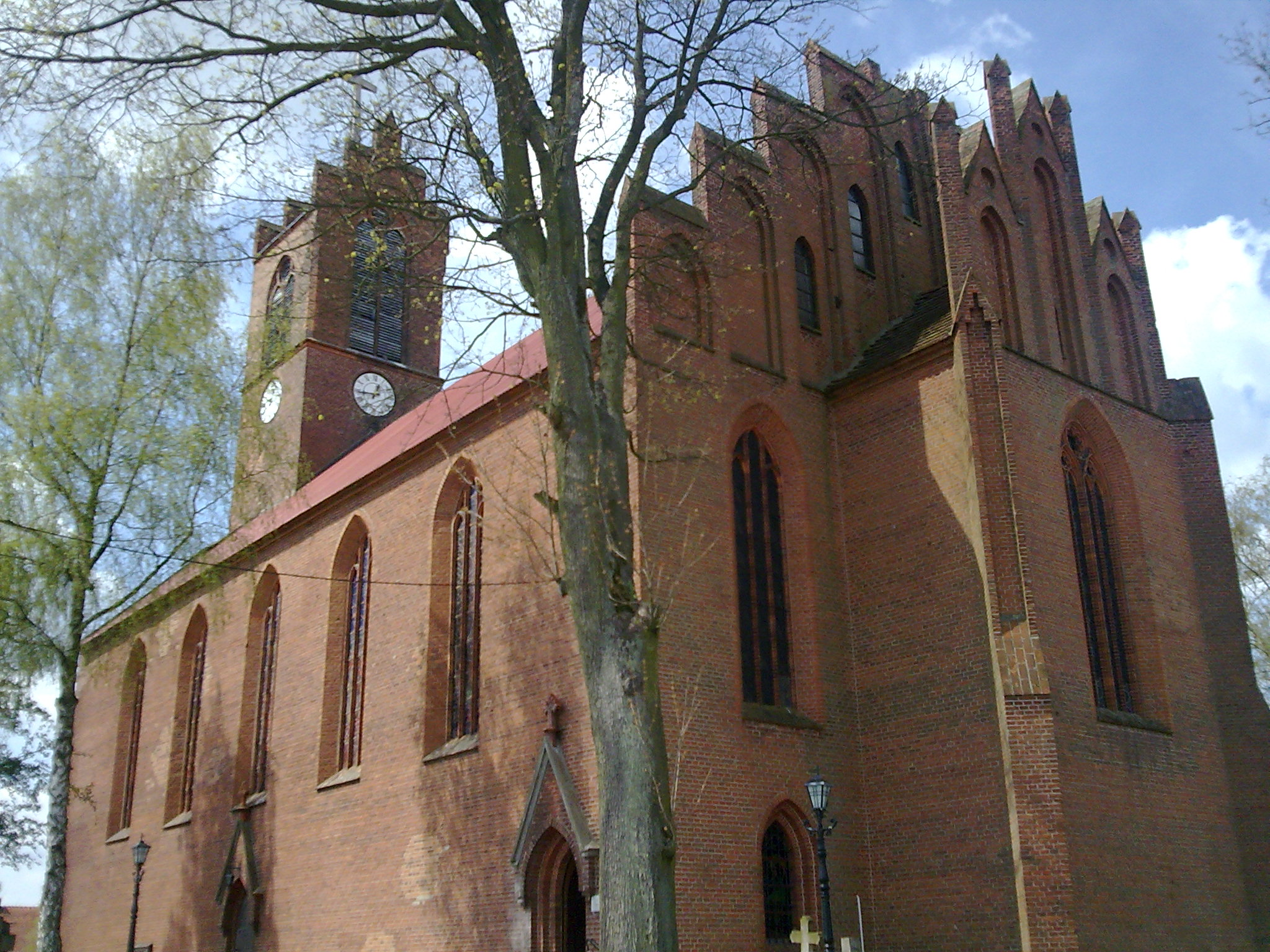
- Saint Jadwiga church in Lichnowy

- Location within Poland
- Coordinates: 53°39′11″N 17°36′27″E
- Country: Poland
- Voivodeship: Pomeranian
- County: Chojnice
- Gmina: Chojnice
- Population: 1,129
- Time zone: UTC+1 (CET)
  - Summer (DST): UTC+2 (CEST)
- Vehicle registration: GCH

Lichnowy [lixˈnɔvɨ] is a village in the administrative district of Gmina Chojnice, within Chojnice County, Pomeranian Voivodeship, in northern Poland. It is located within the historic region of Pomerania.

Lichnowy was a royal village of the Kingdom of Poland, administratively located in the Tuchola County in the Pomeranian Voivodeship.
