= Nicponie =

- Settlement
- Location within Poland
- Coordinates: 53°41′8″N 17°44′47″E
- Country: Poland
- Voivodeship: Pomeranian
- County: Chojnice
- Gmina: Chojnice
- Population: 5

Nicponie [nit͡sˈpɔɲɛ] is a settlement in the administrative district of Gmina Chojnice, within Chojnice County, Pomeranian Voivodeship, in northern Poland.

For details of the history of the region, see History of Pomerania.
