= Lipusz =

- Village
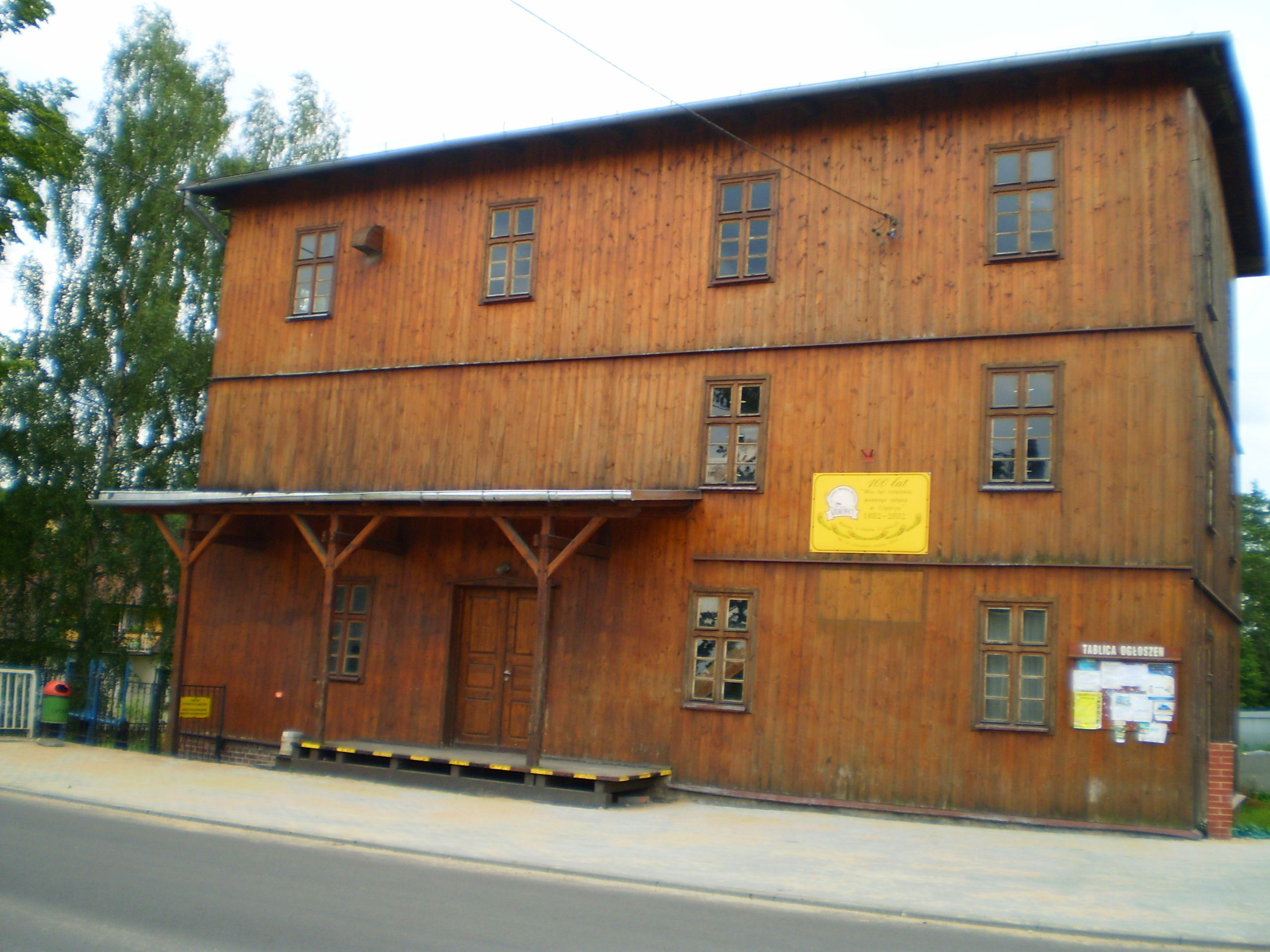
- Old water mill in Lipusz

- Location within Poland
- Coordinates: 54°5′51″N 17°47′4″E
- Country: Poland
- Voivodeship: Pomeranian
- County: Kościerzyna
- Gmina: Lipusz
- Elevation: 150 m (490 ft)
- Population: 2,403
- Time zone: UTC+1 (CET)
  - Summer (DST): UTC+2 (CEST)
- Website: http://www.lipusz.eu

Lipusz [ˈlipuʂ], Formerly "Lippusch", is a village in Kościerzyna County, Pomeranian Voivodeship, in northern Poland. It is the seat of the gmina (administrative district) called Gmina Lipusz. It is located within the ethnocultural region of Kashubia in the historic region of Pomerania.

Lipusz was a royal village of the Polish Crown, administratively located in the Tczew County in the Pomeranian Voivodeship.

During the German occupation of Poland (World War II), in 1939, the Germans carried out a massacre of 20 Poles from Lipusz, including railwaymen, farmers, millers, a secretary of the local forestry, a teacher and a postman, in the nearby forest (see Intelligenzaktion). Families of the victims were expelled. Some Poles from Lipusz were also murdered in the forest near Skarszewy, and further expulsions of Poles were carried out in 1943 and 1944. The expellees were either deported to forced labour or to the General Government.

== Photos ==
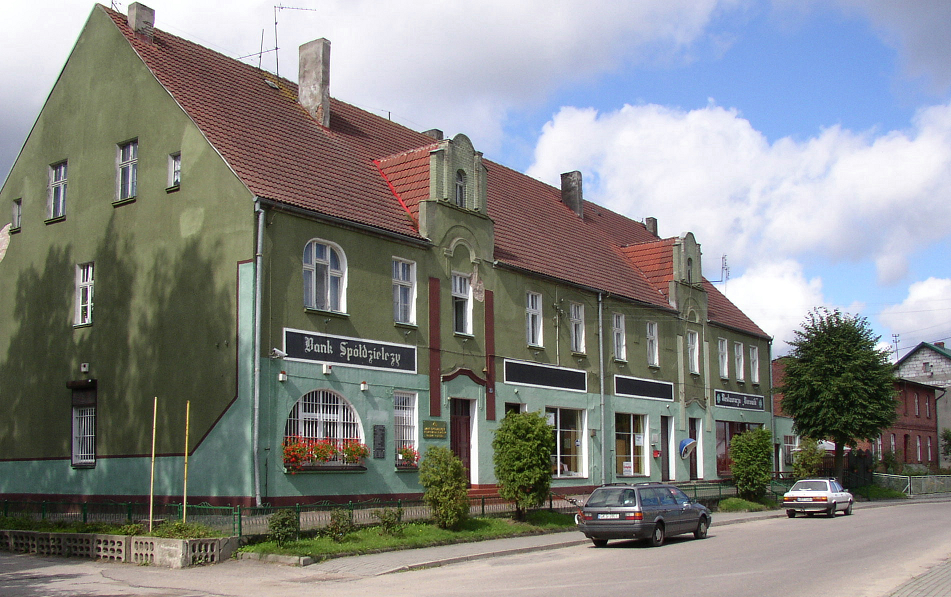
Lipusz Bank

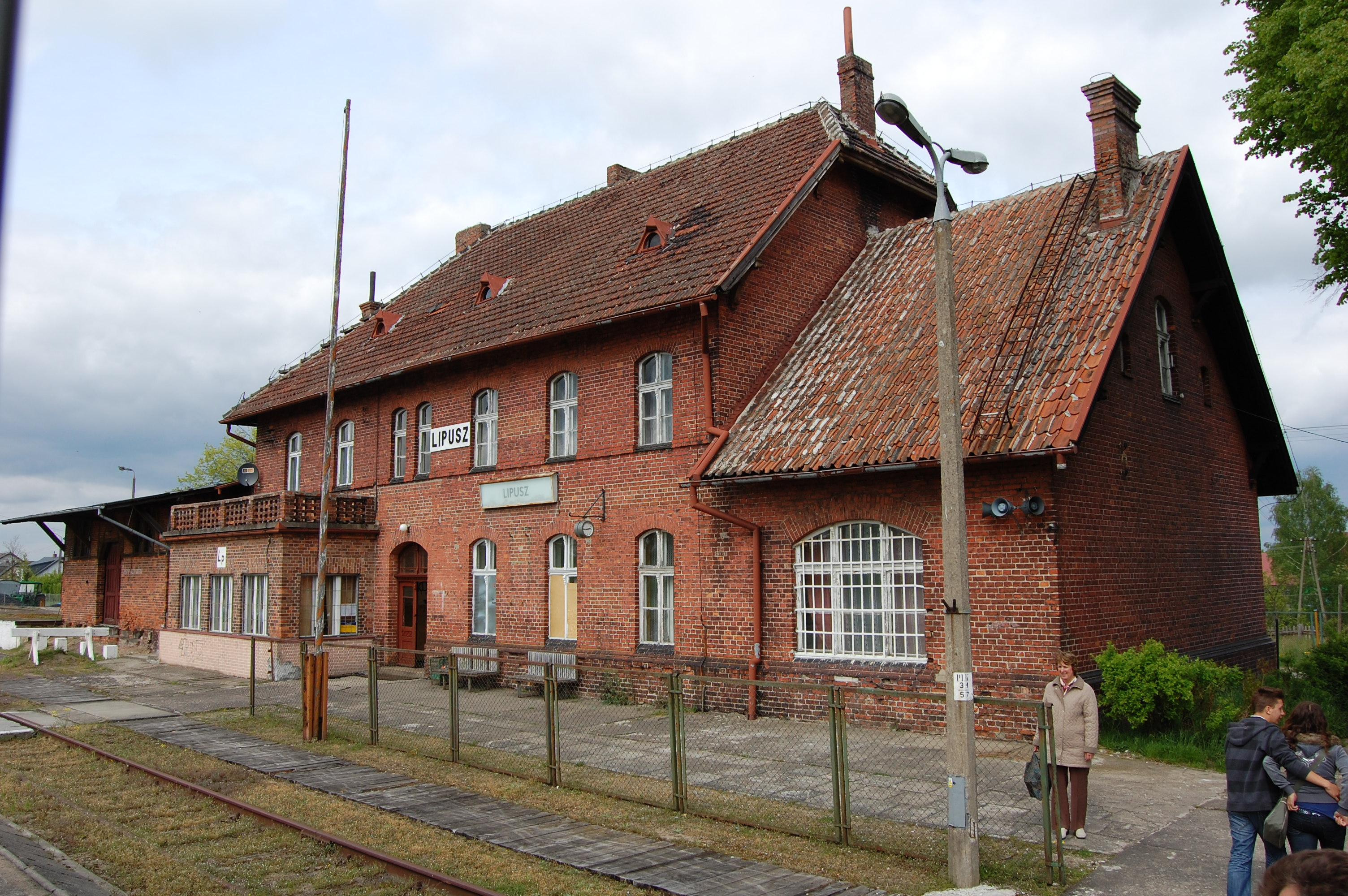
Lipusz Train Station

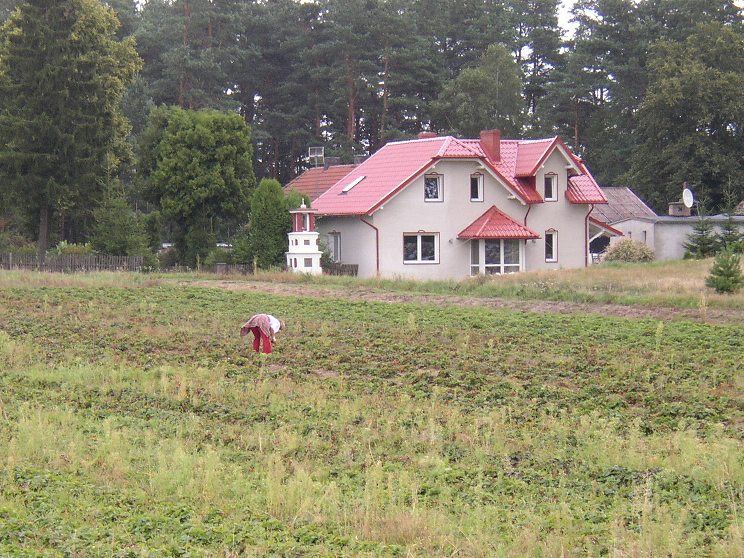
Farming Field in Lipusz

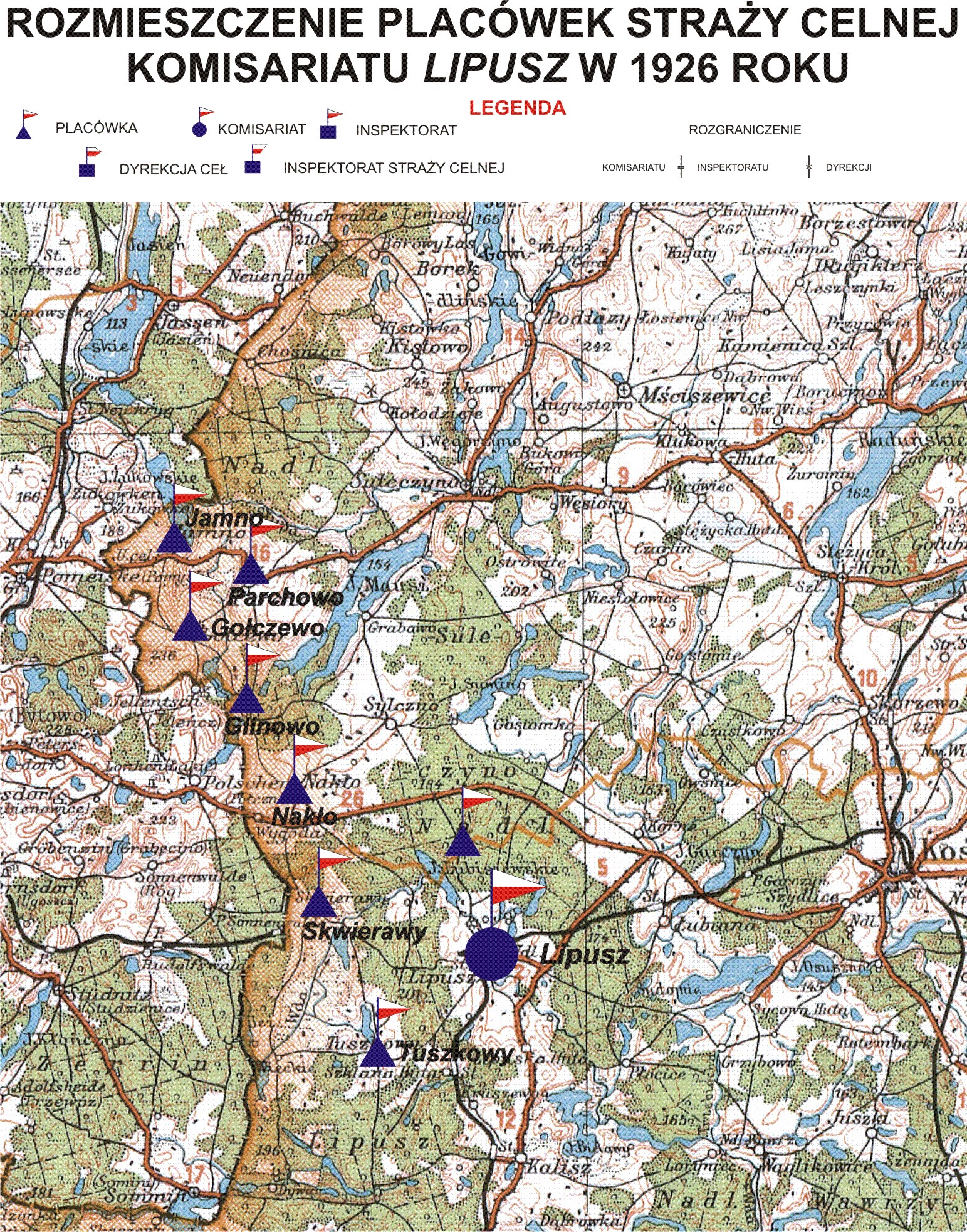
Map of Lipusz
