= Płocice =

- Village
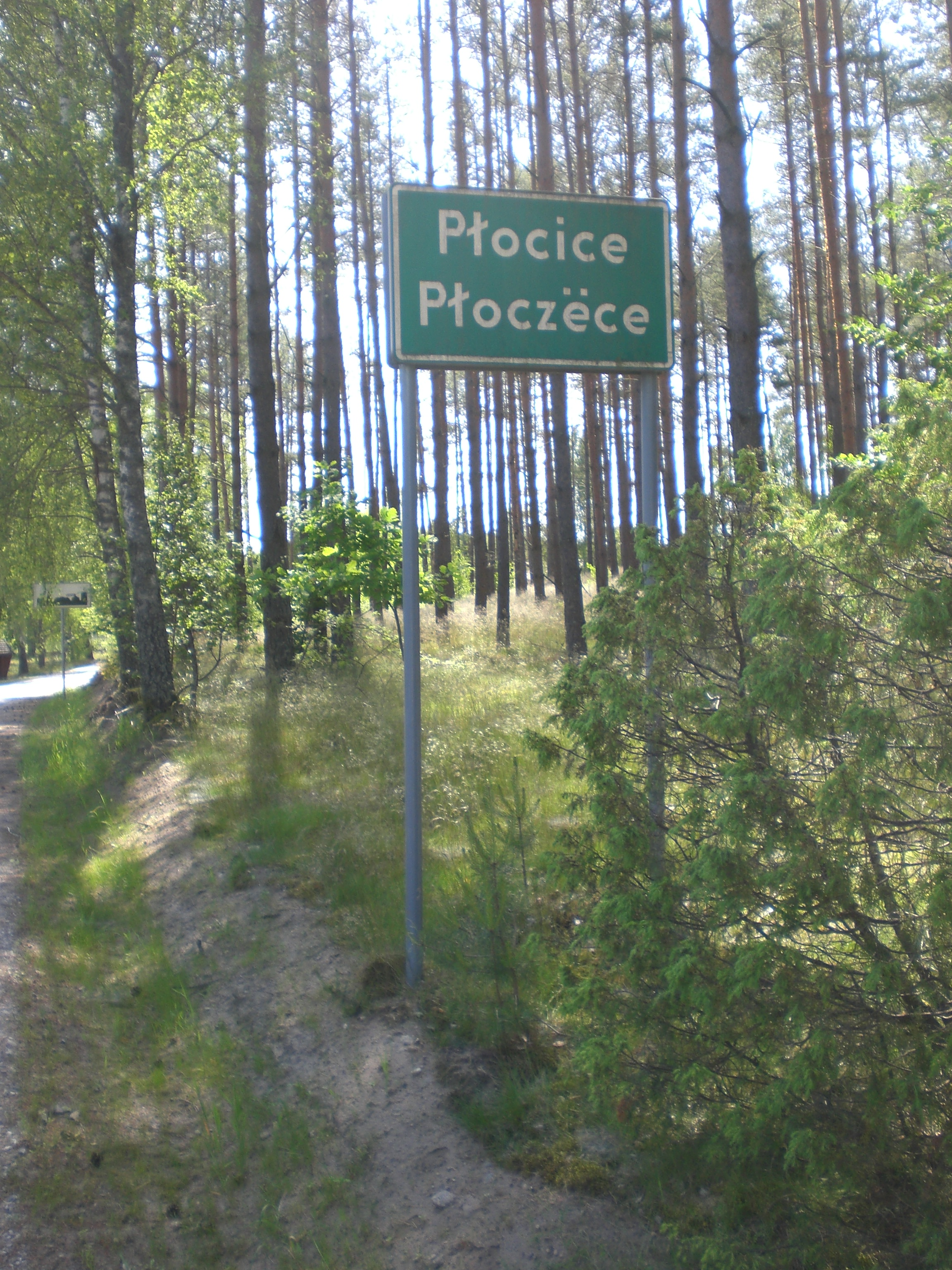

- Location within Poland
- Coordinates: 54°4′18″N 17°50′59″E
- Country: Poland
- Voivodeship: Pomeranian
- County: Kościerzyna
- Gmina: Lipusz
- Highest elevation: 175.29 m (575.1 ft)
- Lowest elevation: 136.70 m (448.5 ft)
- Population: 71

Płocice [pwɔˈt͡ɕit͡sɛ] is a village in the administrative district of Gmina Lipusz, within Kościerzyna County, Pomeranian Voivodeship, in northern Poland.

For details of the history of the region, see History of Pomerania.
