= Jabłonka, Pomeranian Voivodeship =

Jabłonka
- Settlement
- Location within Poland
- Coordinates: 53°43′53″N 17°39′22″E
- Country: Poland
- Voivodeship: Pomeranian
- County: Chojnice
- Gmina: Chojnice

Jabłonka [jaˈbwɔnka] is a settlement in the administrative district of Gmina Chojnice, within Chojnice County, Pomeranian Voivodeship, in northern Poland.

For details of the history of the region, see History of Pomerania.
