= Gmina Chojnice =

Gmina Chojnice Chojnice Commune
- Gmina
- Coat of arms
- Interactive map of Gmina Chojnice
- Coordinates (Chojnice): 53°42′N 17°33′E
- Country: Poland
- Voivodeship: Pomeranian
- County: Chojnice
- Seat: Chojnice

Area
  - Total: 458.34 km^{2} (176.97 sq mi)

Population (2006)
  - Total: 16,014
  - Density: 34.939/km^{2} (90.492/sq mi)
- Website: http://www.gminachojnice.com.pl/

Gmina Chojnice (Kashubian: Chojnice) is a rural gmina (administrative district) in Chojnice County, Pomeranian Voivodeship, in northern Poland. Its seat is the town of Chojnice, although the town is not part of the territory of the gmina.

The gmina covers an area of 458.34 square kilometres (177.0 sq mi), and as of 2006 its total population is 16,014.

The gmina contains parts of the protected areas of Tuchola Landscape Park and Zaborski Landscape Park.

== Villages ==
Gmina Chojnice contains the villages and settlements of Angowice, Babilon, Bachorze, Białe Błota, Borne, Charzykowy, Chiny, Chociński Młyn, Chojnaty, Chojniczki, Chojniczki-Wybudowanie, Ciechocin, Cołdanki, Czartołomie, Dębowa Góra, Doręgowice, Drzewicz, Funka, Gockowice, Granowo, Grzampki, Jabłonka, Jakubowo, Jarcewo, Jasnowo, Jeziorki, Józefowo, Kamionka, Kamionka nad jeziorem Zamarte, Karolewo, Klawkowo, Kłodawa, Kłodawka, Klosnowo, Klucza, Kokoszka, Kopernica, Kopernica nad Jeziorem, Krojanty, Kruszka, Kulki, Lichnowy, Lipienice, Lotyń, Łukomie, Małe Swornegacie, Małe Zanie, Melanówek, Melanowo, Moszczenica, Nicponie, Nieżychowice, Nieżychowice-Wybudowanie, Nowa Cerkiew, Nowa Cerkiew Szlachetna, Nowy Dwór, Objezierze, Ogorzeliny, Ostrowite, Ostrowite ZR, Owink, Pawłówko, Pawłowo, Pawłowo-Wybudowanie, Płęsno, Pomoc, Powałki, Racławki, Sepiot, Silno, Sławęcin, Śluza, Stary Młyn, Sternowo, Strużka, Styporc, Swornegacie, Topole, Wączos, Wielkie Zanie, Władysławek, Wolność, Zbeniny and Zbrzyca.

== Neighbouring gminas ==
Gmina Chojnice is bordered by the gminas of Brusy, Czersk, Człuchów, Kamień Krajeński, Kęsowo, Konarzyny, Lipnica and Tuchola.
