= Kokoszka, Pomeranian Voivodeship =

Kokoszka
- Settlement
- Location within Poland
- Coordinates: 53°50′30″N 17°29′27″E
- Country: Poland
- Voivodeship: Pomeranian
- County: Chojnice
- Gmina: Chojnice
- Population: 24

Kokoszka [kɔˈkɔʂka] is a settlement in the administrative district of Gmina Chojnice, within Chojnice County, Pomeranian Voivodeship, in northern Poland.

For details of the history of the region, see History of Pomerania.
