= Trawice =

- Settlement
- Location within Poland
- Coordinates: 54°3′18″N 17°44′44″E
- Country: Poland
- Voivodeship: Pomeranian
- County: Kościerzyna
- Gmina: Lipusz
- Population: 21

Trawice [traˈvit͡sɛ] (german Trawitz) is a settlement placed near Trawickie Lake in the administrative district of Gmina Lipusz, within Kościerzyna County, Pomeranian Voivodeship, in northern Poland.A comprehensive historical record of Trawice is provided by the Geographical Dictionary of the Kingdom of Poland from 1892. In 1662, it was granted to the Trawicki family by royal privilege of king John Casimir and confirmed by Prussian Kingdom during participation of Poland when Pomeranian region become part of German Empire.The von Koss family, last rulers of Trawice, adopted the surname von Koss-Trawicki.

For details of the history of the region, see History of Pomerania.
