= Jabłuszek Mały =

- Village
- Location within Poland
- Coordinates: 54°2′47″N 17°42′17″E
- Country: Poland
- Voivodeship: Pomeranian
- County: Kościerzyna
- Gmina: Lipusz
- Population: 6

Jabłuszek Mały [jaˈbwuʂɛk ˈmawɨ] is a village in the administrative district of Gmina Lipusz, within Kościerzyna County, Pomeranian Voivodeship, in northern Poland.

For details of the history of the region, see History of Pomerania.
