= Gostomko =

- Village
- Location within Poland
- Coordinates: 54°9′40″N 17°49′26″E
- Country: Poland
- Voivodeship: Pomeranian
- County: Kościerzyna
- Gmina: Lipusz
- Population: 124
- Time zone: UTC+1 (CET)
  - Summer (DST): UTC+2 (CEST)

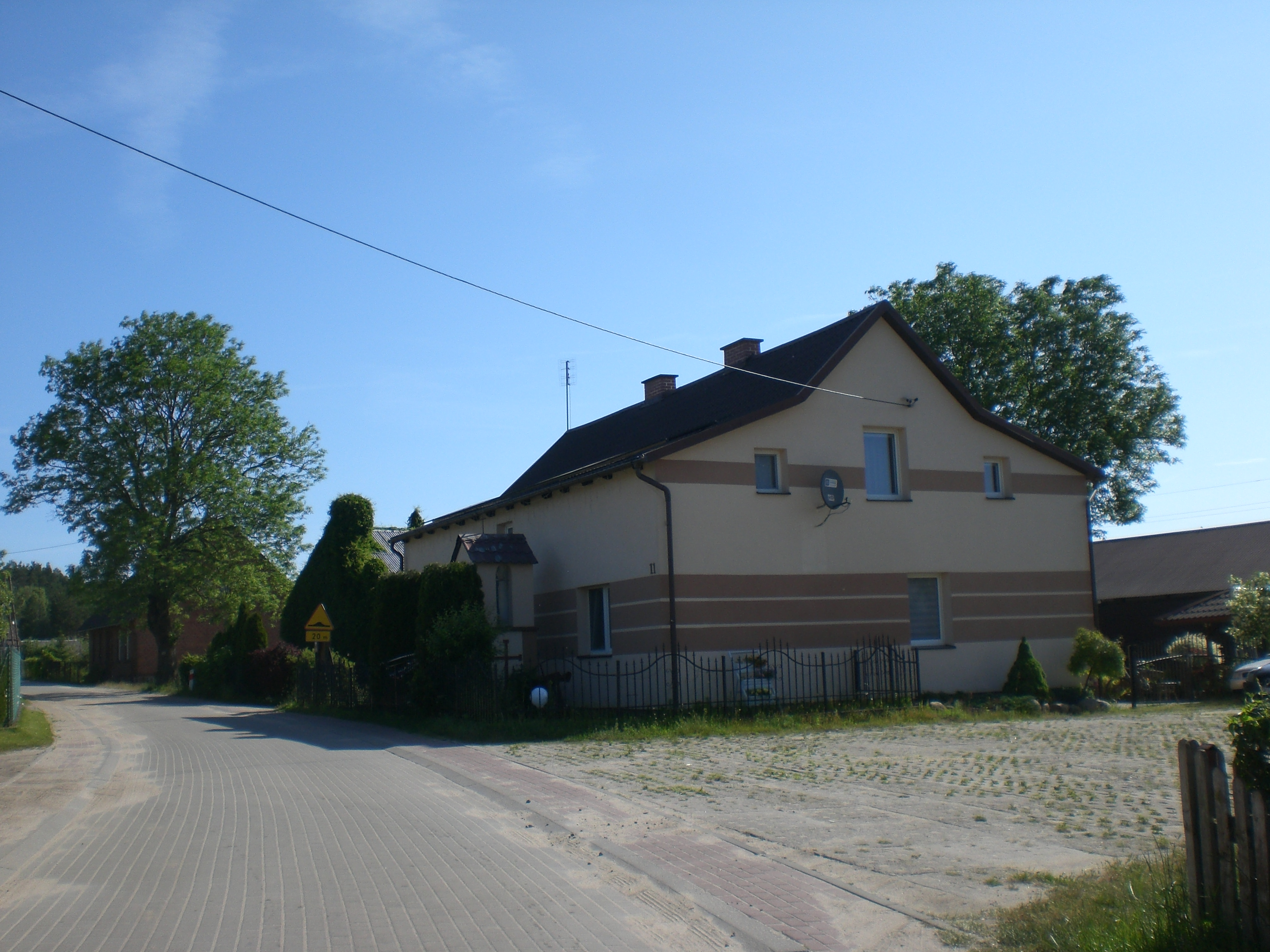
Gostomko 0592

Gostomko [ɡɔsˈtɔmkɔ] is a village in the administrative district of Gmina Lipusz, within Kościerzyna County, Pomeranian Voivodeship, in northern Poland. It is located within the ethnocultural region of Kashubia in the historic region of Pomerania.

Gostomko was a royal village of the Polish Crown, administratively located in the Tczew County in the Pomeranian Voivodeship. It was annexed by Prussia in the First Partition of Poland in 1772, and restored to Poland, after Poland regained independence in 1918.

During the German occupation of Poland (World War II), in 1944, the Germans expelled many Poles, who were deported to the Potulice concentration camp and then sent to forced labour in various places.

== Notable people ==
- Leon Kulas (1903–1964), member of the Pomeranian Griffin Polish resistance group during the German occupation in World War II
