= Sławęcin, Pomeranian Voivodeship =

Sławęcin
- Village
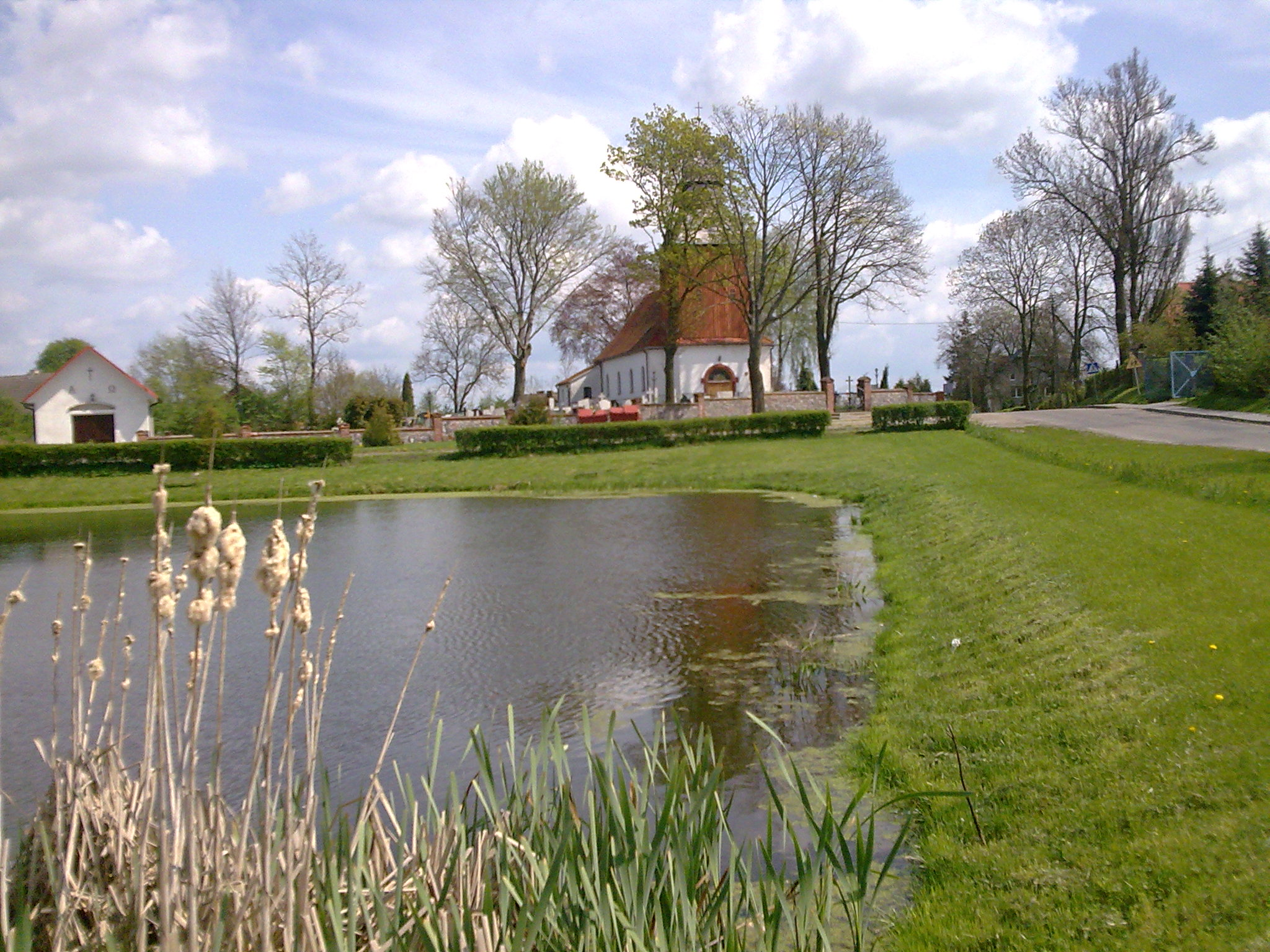
- View of the village with the Saint Catherine church in the background

- Location within Poland
- Coordinates: 53°36′8″N 17°36′53″E
- Country: Poland
- Voivodeship: Pomeranian
- County: Chojnice
- Gmina: Chojnice
- Population: 519
- Time zone: UTC+1 (CET)
  - Summer (DST): UTC+2 (CEST)
- Vehicle registration: GCH

Sławęcin [swaˈvɛnt͡ɕin] is a village in the administrative district of Gmina Chojnice, within Chojnice County, Pomeranian Voivodeship, in northern Poland. It is located within the historic region of Pomerania.

Sławęcin was a royal village of the Polish Crown, administratively located in the Tuchola County in the Pomeranian Voivodeship.

== Notable people ==
- Edmund Kręcki (1880–1958), Polish independence activist during the partition period
