= Lotyń, Pomeranian Voivodeship =

Lotyń
- Village
- Location within Poland
- Coordinates: 53°42′6″N 17°44′5″E
- Country: Poland
- Voivodeship: Pomeranian
- County: Chojnice
- Gmina: Chojnice
- Population: 139

Lotyń [ˈlɔtɨɲ] is a village in the administrative district of Gmina Chojnice, in Chojnice County, Pomeranian Voivodeship, in northern Poland.

For details of the history of the region, see History of Pomerania.
