= Kamionka nad jeziorem Zamarte =

- Settlement
- Location within Poland
- Coordinates: 53°36′22″N 17°29′16″E
- Country: Poland
- Voivodeship: Pomeranian
- County: Chojnice
- Gmina: Chojnice

Kamionka nad jeziorem Zamarte [kaˈmjɔnka ˌnad jɛˈʑɔrɛm zaˈmartɛ] is a settlement in the administrative district of Gmina Chojnice, within Chojnice County, Pomeranian Voivodeship, in northern Poland.

For details of the history of the region, see History of Pomerania.
