= Chojniczki =

- Village
- Location within Poland
- Coordinates: 53°44′24″N 17°32′39″E
- Country: Poland
- Voivodeship: Pomeranian Voivodeship
- County: Chojnice
- Gmina: Chojnice
- Population: 1,422
- Time zone: UTC+1 (CET)
  - Summer (DST): UTC+2 (CEST)

Chojniczki [xɔi̯ˈnit͡ʂki] is a village in the administrative district of Gmina Chojnice, within Chojnice County, Pomeranian Voivodeship, in northern Poland. It is located within the historic region of Pomerania.

Chojniczki was a royal village of the Polish Crown, administratively located in the Człuchów County in the Pomeranian Voivodeship.
