= Krugliniec =

- Village
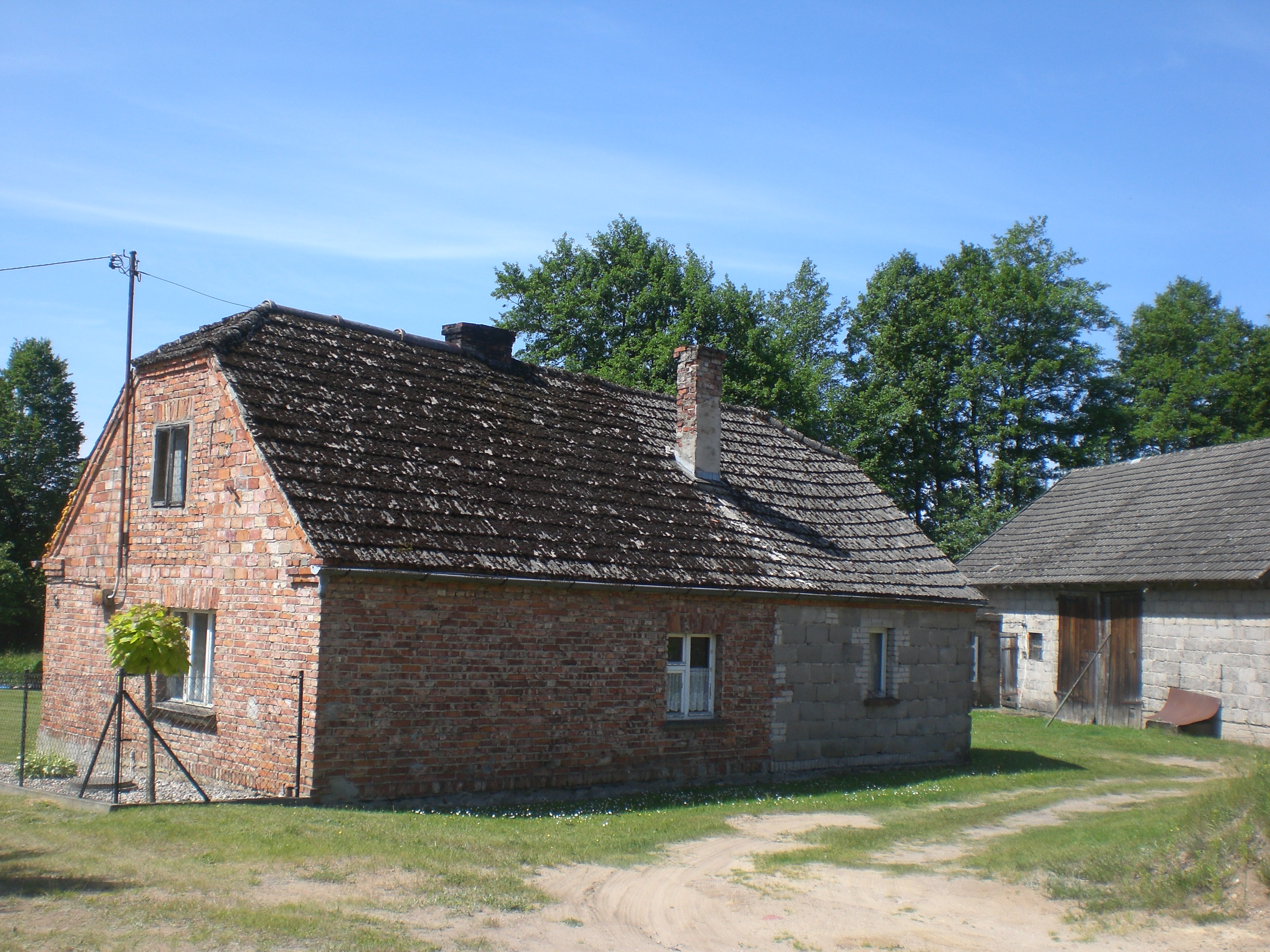

- Location within Poland
- Coordinates: 54°5′3″N 17°48′48″E
- Country: Poland
- Voivodeship: Pomeranian
- County: Kościerzyna
- Gmina: Lipusz
- Population: 26

Krugliniec [kruˈɡliɲɛt͡s] is a village in the administrative district of Gmina Lipusz, within Kościerzyna County, Pomeranian Voivodeship, in northern Poland.

For details of the history of the region, see History of Pomerania.
