= Ogorzeliny =

- Village
- Location within Poland
- Coordinates: 53°36′10″N 17°33′24″E
- Country: Poland
- Voivodeship: Pomeranian
- County: Chojnice
- Gmina: Chojnice
- Population: 779

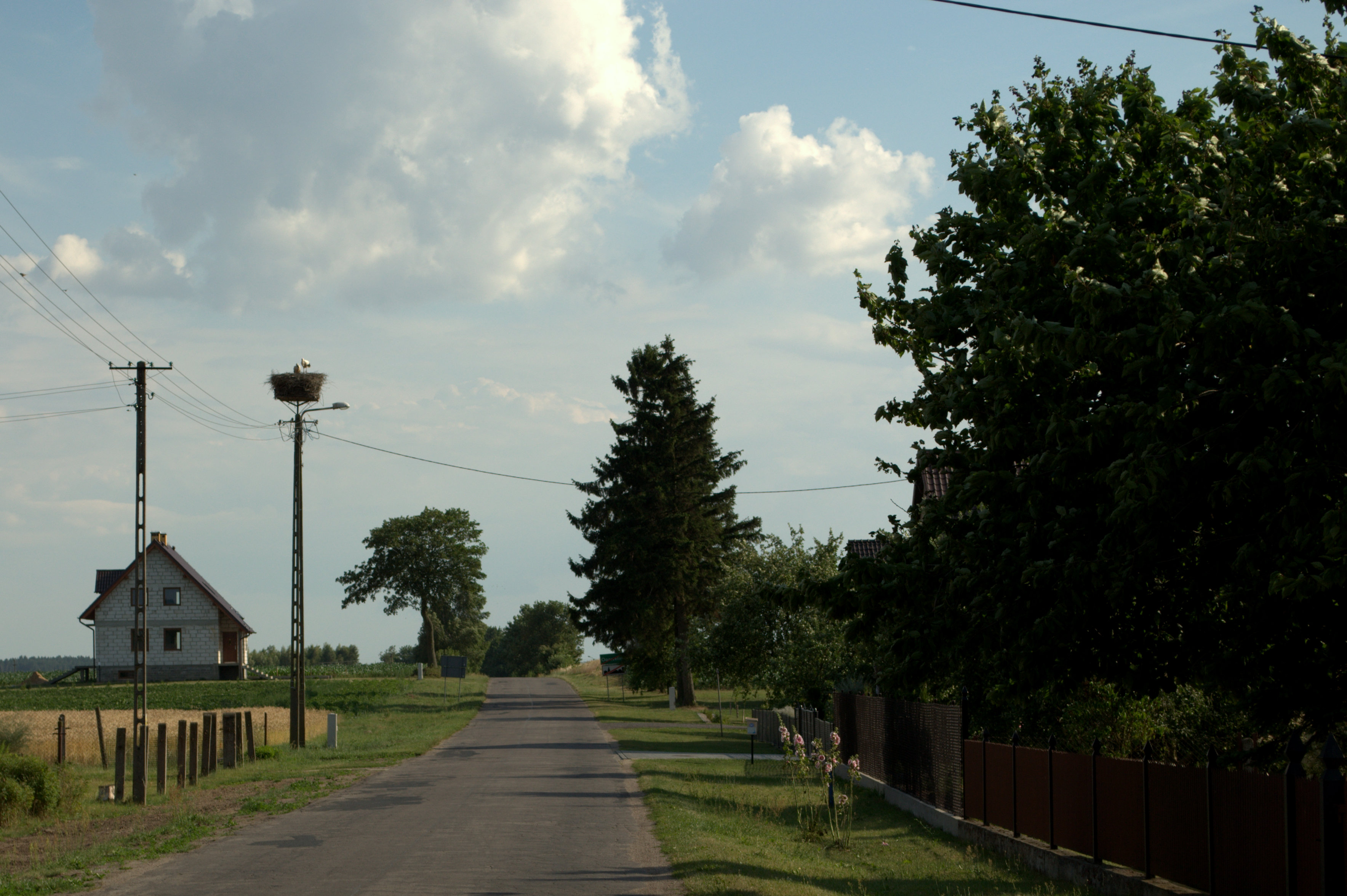
Stork nest in Ogorzeliny, Pomeranian voivodeship, Poland

Ogorzeliny [ɔɡɔʐɛˈlinɨ] is a village in the administrative district of Gmina Chojnice, within Chojnice County, Pomeranian Voivodeship, in northern Poland.

For details of the history of the region, see History of Pomerania.
