= Gmina Lipusz =

Gmina Lipusz Lipusz Commune
- Gmina
- Coat of arms
- Interactive map of Gmina Lipusz
- Coordinates (Lipusz): 54°5′43″N 17°46′57″E
- Country: Poland
- Voivodeship: Pomeranian
- County: Kościerzyna
- Seat: Lipusz

Area
  - Total: 109.2 km^{2} (42.2 sq mi)

Population (2022)
  - Total: 3,767
  - Density: 34.50/km^{2} (89.35/sq mi)
- Website: http://uglipusz.w.interia.pl

Gmina Lipusz (Kashubian: Lëpùsz) is a rural gmina (administrative district) in Kościerzyna County, Pomeranian Voivodeship, in northern Poland. Its seat is the village of Lipusz, which lies approximately 14 kilometres (9 mi) west of Kościerzyna and 64 km (40 mi) south-west of the regional capital Gdańsk.

The gmina covers an area of 109.2 square kilometres (42.2 sq mi), and as of 2022 its total population is 3,767.

The gmina contains part of the protected area called Wdydze Landscape Park.

The gmina is twinned with Madawaska Valley, Ontario, Canada.

== Villages ==
Gmina Lipusz contains the villages and settlements of Bałachy, Gostomko, Jabłuszek Duży, Jabłuszek Mały, Krosewo, Krugliniec, Lipuska Huta, Lipusz, Papiernia, Płocice, Płocice-Kula, Śluza, Szklana Huta, Szwedzki Ostrów, Trawice, Tuszkowy and Wyrówno.

== Neighbouring gminas ==
Gmina Lipusz is bordered by the gminas of Dziemiany, Kościerzyna, Parchowo, Studzienice and Sulęczyno.
