= Zbeniny =

- Village
- Location within Poland
- Coordinates: 53°44′59″N 17°37′16″E
- Country: Poland
- Voivodeship: Pomeranian
- County: Chojnice
- Gmina: Chojnice
- Population: 209 (2,008)

Zbeniny [zbɛˈninɨ] is a village in the administrative district of Gmina Chojnice, within Chojnice County, Pomeranian Voivodeship, in northern Poland.

For details of the history of the region, see History of Pomerania.

In the middle of the village there is a neoclassicist palace, built in 1857 and expanded in 1926 for the Chrzanowski family. It is a single-story building with two wings, and a two-story central part with a portico, covered with a high mansard roof.
