= Melanówek =

- Settlement
- Location within Poland
- Coordinates: 53°35′11″N 17°33′4″E
- Country: Poland
- Voivodeship: Pomeranian
- County: Chojnice
- Gmina: Chojnice
- Population: 97

Melanówek [mɛlaˈnuvɛk] is a settlement in the administrative district of Gmina Chojnice, within Chojnice County, Pomeranian Voivodeship, in northern Poland.

For details of the history of the region, see History of Pomerania.
