= Funka =

- Village
- Location within Poland
- Coordinates: 53°46′29″N 17°31′32″E
- Country: Poland
- Voivodeship: Pomeranian
- County: Chojnice
- Gmina: Chojnice
- Population: 164

Funka [ˈfunka] is a village in the administrative district of Gmina Chojnice, within Chojnice County, Pomeranian Voivodeship, in northern Poland.

For details of the history of the region, see History of Pomerania.
