= Wolność, Pomeranian Voivodeship =

Wolność
- Settlement
- Location within Poland
- Coordinates: 53°44′19″N 17°28′54″E
- Country: Poland
- Voivodeship: Pomeranian
- County: Chojnice
- Gmina: Chojnice
- Population: 23

Wolność [ˈvɔlnɔɕt͡ɕ] is a settlement in the administrative district of Gmina Chojnice, within Chojnice County, Pomeranian Voivodeship, in northern Poland.

For details of the history of the region, see History of Pomerania.
