= Nowy Dwór, Chojnice County =

Nowy Dwór
- Village
- Location within Poland
- Coordinates: 53°37′39″N 17°33′2″E
- Country: Poland
- Voivodeship: Pomeranian
- County: Chojnice
- Gmina: Chojnice
- Population: 127
- Time zone: UTC+1 (CET)
  - Summer (DST): UTC+2 (CEST)
- Vehicle registration: GCH

Nowy Dwór [ˈnɔvɨ ˈdvur] is a village in the administrative district of Gmina Chojnice, within Chojnice County, Pomeranian Voivodeship, in northern Poland. It is located within the historic region of Pomerania.

Nowy Dwór was a royal village of the Polish Crown, administratively located in the Człuchów County in the Pomeranian Voivodeship.

== Notable people ==
- Bartłomiej Nowodworski (ca. 1552–1625), Polish military leader and publicist, Knight of Malta, was born in the village
