= Szklana Huta, Pomeranian Voivodeship =

Szklana Huta
- Village
- Location within Poland
- Coordinates: 54°4′9″N 17°45′44″E
- Country: Poland
- Voivodeship: Pomeranian
- County: Kościerzyna
- Gmina: Lipusz
- Population: 157

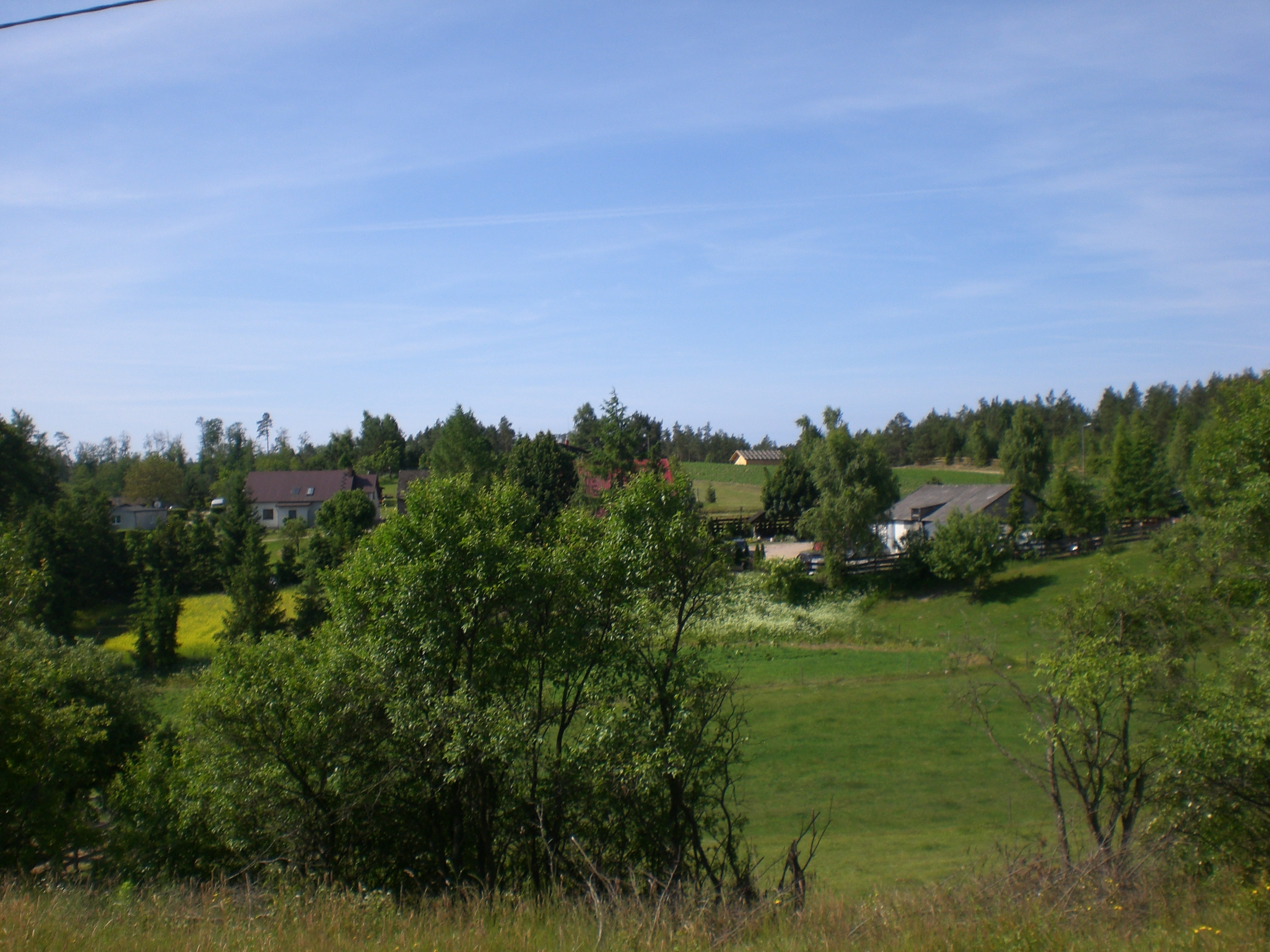
Szklana Huta 0616

Szklana Huta [ˈʂklana ˈxuta] is a village in the administrative district of Gmina Lipusz, within Kościerzyna County, Pomeranian Voivodeship, in northern Poland.

For details of the history of the region, see History of Pomerania.
