= Borne, Gmina Chojnice =

Borne
- Village
- Location within Poland
- Coordinates: 53°49′2″N 17°25′20″E
- Country: Poland
- Voivodeship: Pomeranian
- County: Chojnice
- Gmina: Chojnice
- Elevation: 127 m (417 ft)
- Population: 12

Borne [ˈbɔrnɛ] is a village in the administrative district of Gmina Chojnice, within Chojnice County, Pomeranian Voivodeship, in northern Poland.

For details of the history of the region, see History of Pomerania.
