= Strużka, Chojnice County =

Strużka
- Settlement
- Location within Poland
- Coordinates: 53°48′21″N 17°30′53″E
- Country: Poland
- Voivodeship: Pomeranian
- County: Chojnice
- Gmina: Chojnice

Strużka [ˈstruʂka] is a settlement in the administrative district of Gmina Chojnice, within Chojnice County, Pomeranian Voivodeship, in northern Poland.

For details of the history of the region, see History of Pomerania.
