= Płęsno =

- Settlement
- Location within Poland
- Coordinates: 53°52′30″N 17°32′16″E
- Country: Poland
- Voivodeship: Pomeranian
- County: Chojnice
- Gmina: Chojnice
- Elevation: 149 m (489 ft)
- Population: 36

Płęsno ([ˈpwɛ̃snɔ]; German: Plensno) is a settlement in the administrative district of Gmina Chojnice, within Chojnice County, Pomeranian Voivodeship, in northern Poland.

For details of the history of the region, see History of Pomerania.
