= Granowo, Pomeranian Voivodeship =

Granowo
- Village
- Location within Poland
- Coordinates: 53°39′39″N 17°38′55″E
- Country: Poland
- Pomeranian: Pomeranian
- County: Chojnice
- Gmina: Chojnice
- Population: 184
- Time zone: UTC+1 (CET)
  - Summer (DST): UTC+2 (CEST)
- Vehicle registration: GCH

Granowo ([ɡraˈnɔvɔ]; German: Granau) is a village in the administrative district of Gmina Chojnice, within Chojnice County, Pomeranian Voivodeship, in northern Poland. It is located within the historic region of Pomerania.

Granowo was a royal village of the Kingdom of Poland, administratively located in the Tuchola County in the Pomeranian Voivodeship.
