= Kłodawa, Chojnice County =

Kłodawa
- Village
- Location within Poland
- Coordinates: 53°44′45″N 17°38′9″E
- Country: Poland
- Voivodeship: Pomeranian
- County: Chojnice
- Gmina: Chojnice

Population
  - Total: 329
- Time zone: UTC+1 (CET)
  - Summer (DST): UTC+2 (CEST)

Kłodawa [kwɔˈdava] is a village in the administrative district of Gmina Chojnice, within Chojnice County, Pomeranian Voivodeship, in northern Poland.

Seven Polish citizens were murdered by Nazi Germany in the village during World War II.
