= Italian immigration to Switzerland =

Italian migrants in Switzerland
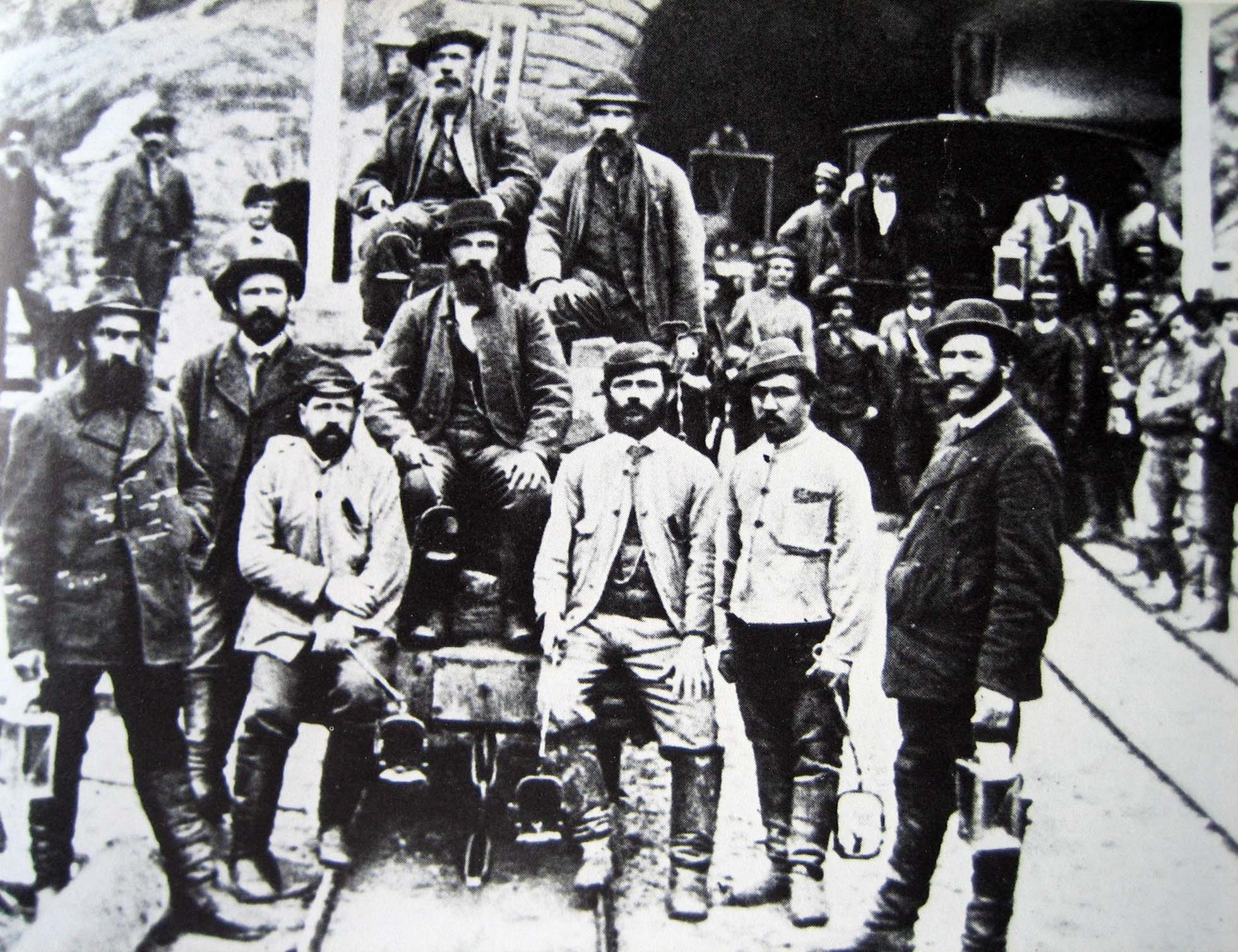
- Construction workers, mostly Italian, at the Gotthard Tunnel in Airolo around 1880.

Total population
- c. 295,000 (by birth) c. 530,000 (by ancestry, corresponding to about 7% of the total Swiss population)

Regions with significant populations
- Heavily concentrated in Bern, Zürich, Basel, Lugano, Lausanne

Languages
- Swiss Italian · Swiss French · Swiss German · Romansh · Italian and Italian dialects

Religion
- Roman Catholicism (74%)

Related ethnic groups
- Italians, Italian Belgians, Italian Britons, Italian Finns, Italian French, Italian Germans, Italian Romanians, Italian Spaniards, Italian Swedes, Corfiot Italians, Genoese in Gibraltar, Italians of Crimea, Italians of Odesa

Italian immigration to Switzerland (unrelated to the indigenous Italian-speaking population in Ticino and in the southern part of Grisons) is related to the Italian diaspora in Switzerland. Italian emigration to Switzerland took place mainly from the end of the 19th century.

== History ==
The first Italian immigrants came to Switzerland in the 16th century as religious refugees following the Reformation. However, it was an elite immigration. In the early 19th century, Switzerland was important as a refuge for Italian liberals such as Giuseppe Mazzini, who were opposed at home.

The history of Italian emigration to Switzerland continues in the second half of the 19th century. The majority of emigrants initially came from Northern Italy, above all from Veneto, Friuli-Venezia Giulia and Lombardy. In 1860 there were 10,000 Italians in Switzerland, in 1900 there were 117,059 and in 1910, 202,809. More than three-quarters came from Piedmont, Lombardy and Veneto, while immigration from the centre-south was small.

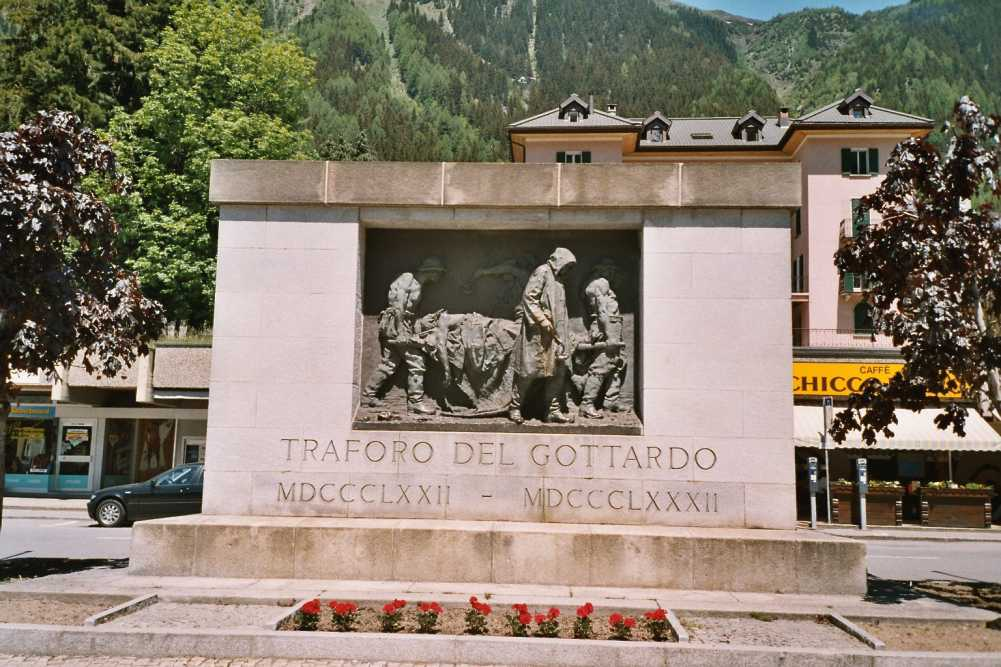
Monument to the workers—mostly Italian—who died in Switzerland during the construction of the Gotthard Tunnel

Labor immigration from Italy began on a large scale in the late 19th century as part of industrialization and in the course of major construction projects such as the Gotthard railway or the Simplon tunnel. Most of the immigrants that reached the country in that period eventually returned to Italy after the rise of Fascism. Future Italian leader Benito Mussolini himself emigrated in Switzerland in 1902, only to be deported after becoming involved in the socialist movement. In the 1930s there was also a small emigration of Italian anti-fascist intellectuals and politicians, who gave birth to the so-called "Free Italian Colonies". The outbreak of World War II temporarily halted Italian emigration to Switzerland. During World War II, from autumn 1943 until the end of the war, more than 40,000 people fled Italy to Switzerland for political issues, including the future President of Italy Luigi Einaudi.

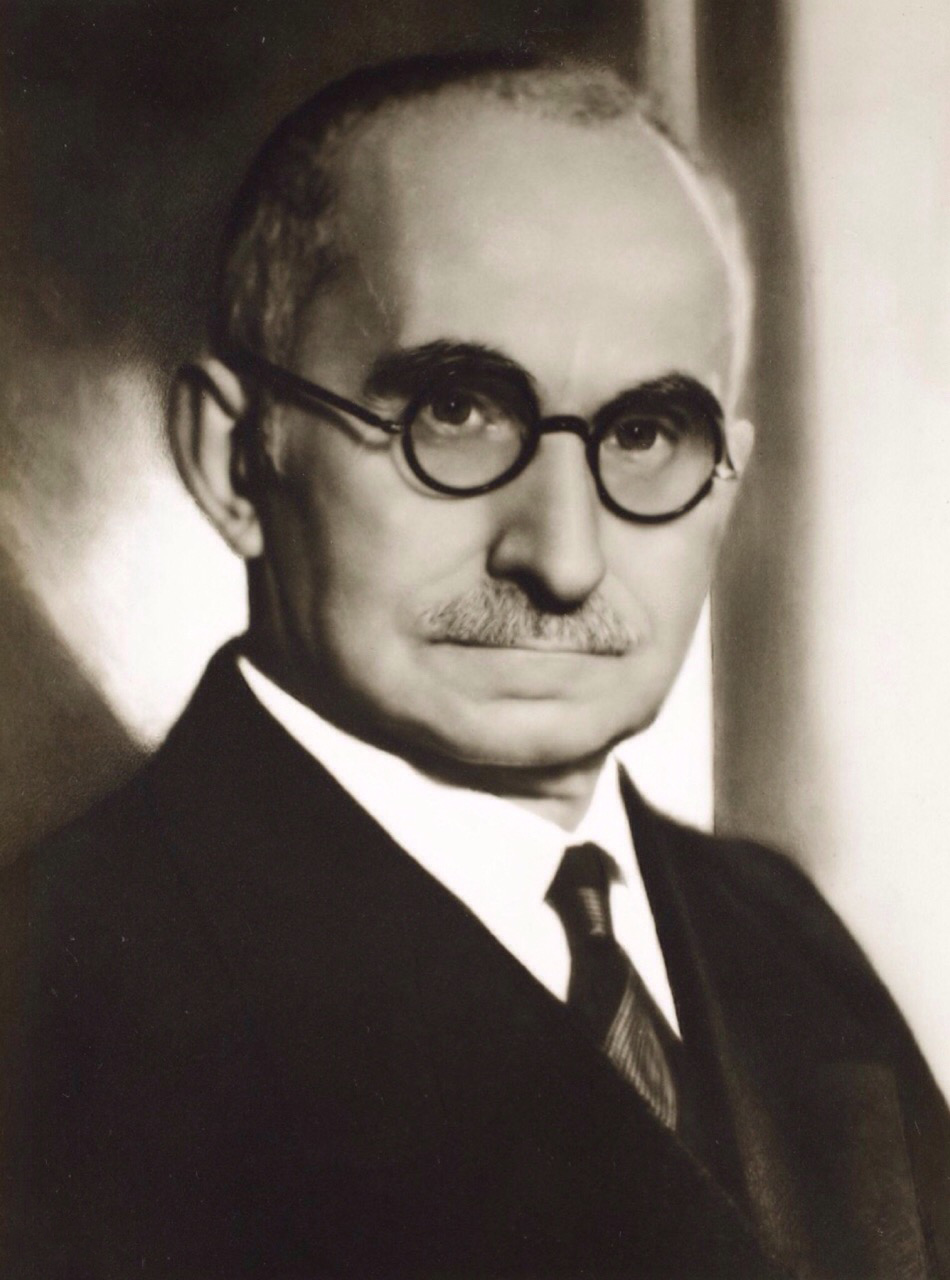
Luigi Einaudi

From 1945, after the end of World War II, Italian emigration to Switzerland resumed due to the war destruction of the Italian economy. At the end of the 1950s, emigration from central-northern Italy stopped, due to the Italian economic miracle, while that from southern Italy increased. The importance of Italian emigration to Switzerland can also be deduced from the fact that there were over seven million departures of Italian emigrants from Italy to abroad between 1945 and 1976, and as many as two million were those who settled in Switzerland. Almost 70% of the Italians who emigrated to Switzerland after World War II settled in the German-speaking cantons.

The new migratory wave begun after 1945 was favored by the lax immigration laws then in force. At first the Swiss government encouraged the arrival of guest workers, assigning them different types of work permits, some forbidding job switching, ranging from the "frontaliere" permit given to Italians living near the Swiss border to the "C" permit granting the same status of a Swiss citizen minus the political rights.

James Schwarzenbach

The Italian population climbed steadily until 1975. Italians made up over two-thirds of the entire foreign population residing in Switzerland. In 1970 there were one million immigrants in Switzerland, 54% of whom were Italians. In 1975 the highest point was reached and 573,085 Italians were registered. This mass arrival of workers, in fact requested by a Swiss economy in full swing, did not fail to arouse xenophobic waves on the part of the local population and political initiatives on the part of nationalist parties, to reduce the number of foreigners, especially Italians, in the country. In this sense, in 1970 the Schwarzenbach Initiative, which was aimed mainly against Italians and which provided for a ceiling of 10% for the foreign population, was rejected in a referendum with 54% of votes against. Rising friction with the indigenous majority even led to the creation of an "anti-Italians party" in 1963, the Schweizerische überparteiliche Bewegung zur Verstärkung der Volksrechte und der direkten Demokratie ("Swiss non-partisan movement to strengthen popular rights and direct democracy "), founded by Albert Stocker in Zürich.

As every other immigrant group at the time, Italians were faced with a policy of forced integration, later satirised in the highly successful 1978 comedy film Die Schweizermacher (literally "The Swissmakers"), which went on to become the fifth most-watched film of all time in Switzerland Many of the Italian migrants in the 1960s and early 1970s were seasonal workers, whose residence permit was limited to nine months and renewable if necessary, mainly employed in the construction, manufacturing and hotel sectors. Only after years and under certain conditions did foreign workers receive permission for family reunification.

Following this large flow of Italian workers, from 1964 to 1989 the Television of Italian Switzerland (TSI) in co-production with RAI, broadcast the weekly program Un'ora per voi ("An hour for you"), dedicated to Italians in Switzerland. In Switzerland, the Italian language is the national language and recognized as the official language of the Confederation, together with German, French and Romansh. Italian is spoken as an indigenous language in the Italian-speaking population in Ticino and in the southern part of Grisons. Although Italian is an integral part of the Swiss cultural and linguistic fabric, outside Italian-speaking Switzerland its importance and use in the community is decreasing.

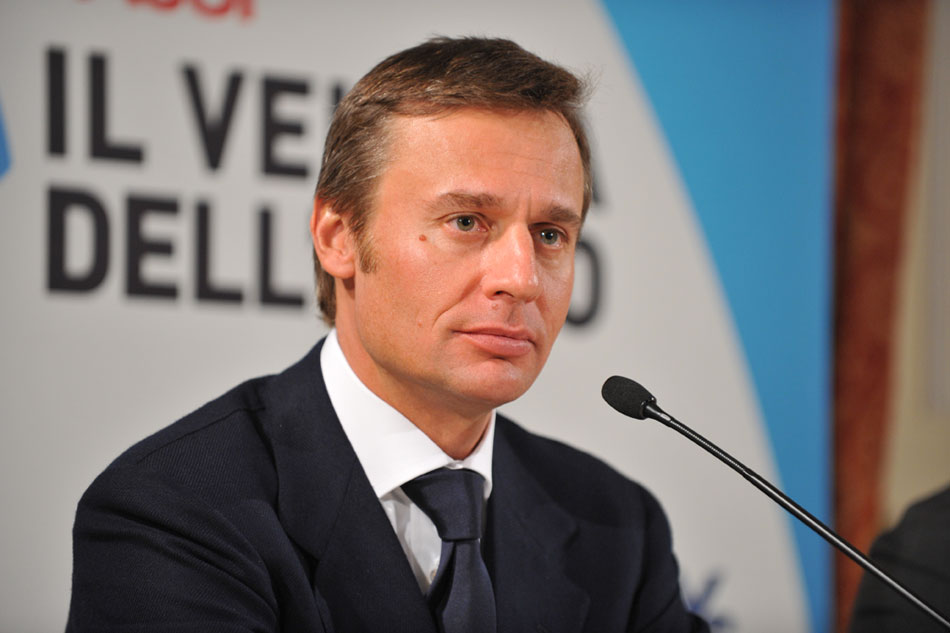
Ernesto Bertarelli

Since the 1990s, there has been a substantial emigration of Italian entrepreneurs to Switzerland. The flow, very modest in past years (but which began in the 1960s) has strengthened. The best known figure is that of Ernesto Bertarelli, son of the entrepreneur Fabio Bertarelli who in 1977 moved the Serono family business from Rome to Geneva. Since the 1990s, the transfer of Italian entrepreneurs to Switzerland has been accentuated, especially in the cantons of Ticino and in the southern part of Grisons (favored by geographical proximity, by the common Italian language and by territorial marketing policies). The reasons for these transfers are mainly the leaner Swiss bureaucracy, the lower tax burden, better infrastructure and the presence of technology parks.

The Italian-Swiss community has opened numerous schools in the main cities of the country (financed in part by the immigrants themselves, in part by the federal authorities). Two primary schools, one secondary school and one grammar school in Basel; a primary school, a secondary school and a high school in Lausanne; a secondary school and a grammar school in Zug; a primary school, a secondary school, an art school and a high school in Zürich; a primary school, a secondary school and three technical colleges in St. Gallen.

An agreement between Switzerland and Italy has allowed Italians residing in Switzerland and who have applied to acquire Swiss citizenship to maintain Italian citizenship, acquiring dual citizenship; this has led to a growth in requests for naturalization, allowing them to enjoy civic rights in both countries and thus accelerating the process of integration and active participation in Swiss political life. According to the federal statistics office, in 2017 the Italian-Swiss with dual citizenship were, with over 225,000 individuals, the most numerous among the naturalized people who decide to maintain their original citizenship.

The children of emigrants to Switzerland, which began after the war until the early 1980s, hardly decide to return to their homeland, unlike their parents who sometimes take the way back when they reach retirement age. Since the 1990s, the issue of returning, with the aging of the emigrant population, has led to the confrontation with new social problems; in fact, many decide to stay in Switzerland to be close to their children and grandchildren, and others decide to return to Italy. Those who have decided to return may find themselves "emigrants" for a second time, when they realize that the habits of their childhood and the friendships of the past are no longer there, in an Italy that has certainly changed.

== Characteristics ==
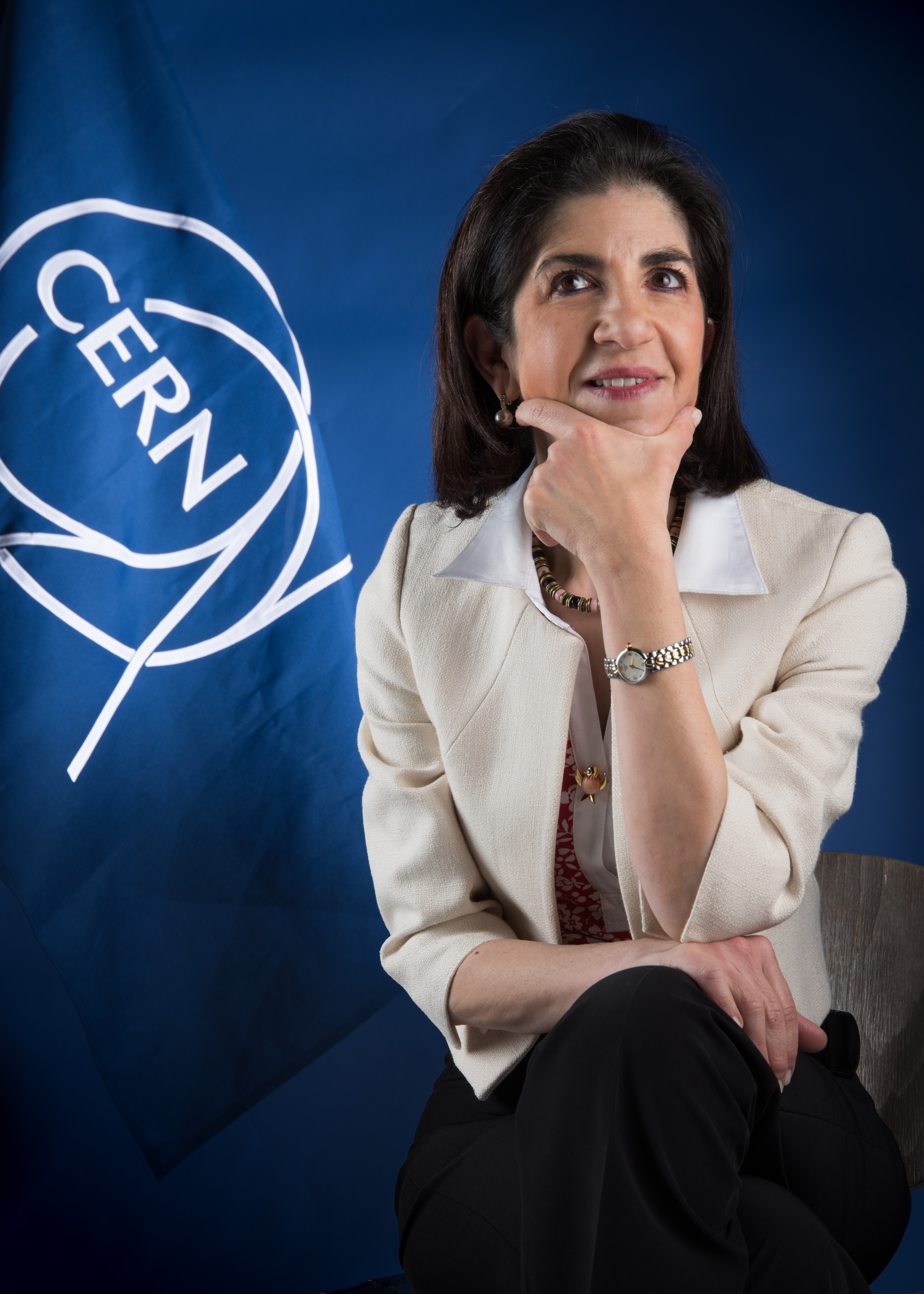
Fabiola Gianotti

In 2000, counting the naturalized with dual citizenship, the Italians in Switzerland exceeded 527,000 people. In 2007, foreigners in Switzerland represented 23% of the population and the Italian community was still the largest (18.9% of the foreign population). The official registry office of the Italian Ministry of the Interior attested that in 2007, 500,565 Italians lived in Switzerland with the right to vote, therefore adults registered with AIRE and 261,180 households.

In 2017, the Federal Statistical Office of the Confederation counted 317,300 Italian residents, still the largest community representing 14.9% of the foreign population to which must be added the 225,889 naturalized citizens with dual citizenship, for a total of 543,189 Italians. Most Italians in Switzerland come from Lombardy (15%), Campania (13.1%), Apulia (12.4%), Sicily (12.1%) and Veneto (8.4%).

Italian citizens remain the largest non-naturalized group (ca. 290,000, followed by 270,000 Germans). The total number of "ethnic Italians" in Switzerland is around half a million, but there are no official statistics on ethnicity, and furthermore cultural assimilation and cross-marriage makes it difficult to determine who among the second or third generation descendants of Italian emigrants should be counted as "ethnic Italian".

Another aspect not strictly connected with emigration, but linked to the world of work between Italy and Switzerland is that of the frontier worker, or Italian citizens residing in Italy who go to work every day in the border cantons, and then return to home. The presence of Italian frontier workers in Ticino is particularly active, with over 58,000 daily presences representing more than 22% of the local workforce.

As of 2008 there is a small resurfacing of Italian immigration, when after decades the migratory balance of Italians returned positive (2,213 new Italian immigrants to Switzerland). With the Great Recession, starting from 2010 the migratory flow of Italians to Switzerland resumed; in 2015 there were 18,900. This renewed migratory flow led Italians to be the first foreign group in Switzerland, overtaking German citizens who in the 2000s had reached the record. Today the typology of the Italian emigrant is more heterogeneous than in the past, when they mainly occupied jobs in construction, catering and manual industry. Today, in addition to the category of average workers and skilled craftsmen, a percentage of Italians who come to Switzerland are graduates and hold positions of responsibility in scientific and cultural institutes, such as, for example, the physicist Fabiola Gianotti, director general of CERN in Geneva.

== Film on Italian emigration to Switzerland ==
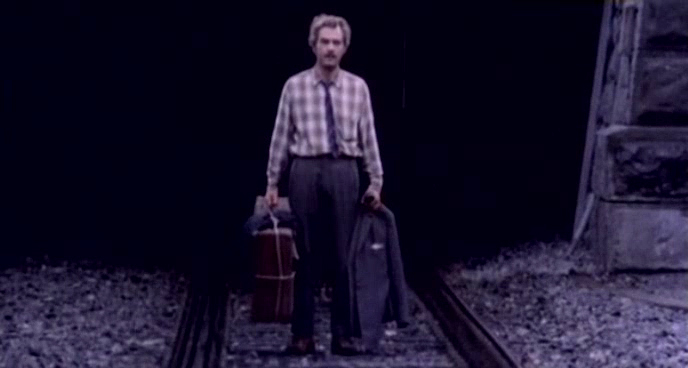
A scene from the film Bread and Chocolate (1974)

- Bread and Chocolate by Franco Brusati (1974)
- The Swissmakers by Rolf Lyssy (1978)
- Azzurro by Denis Rabaglia (2000)

== See also ==
- Italy–Switzerland relations
- James Schwarzenbach
- Swiss people in Italy
