= Anna Ferruzzo =

Italian actress (born 1966)

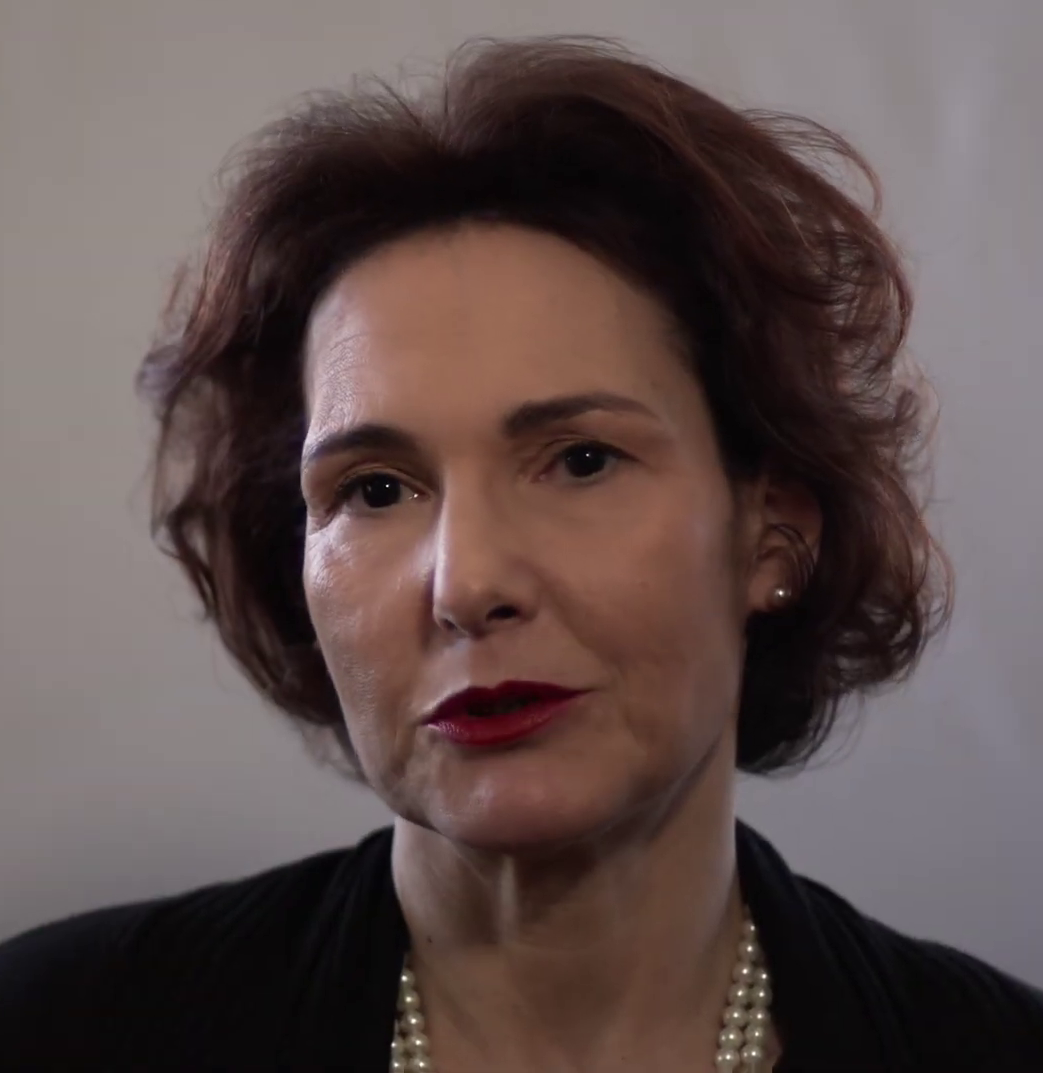
- Ferruzzo in 2021
- Born: 17 February 1966 (age 60); Taranto, Italy
- Occupation: Actress
- Years active: 1984–present
- Spouse: Massimo Wertmüller (m. 2018)

Anna Ferruzzo (born 17 February 1966) is an Italian film, stage and television actress.

== Life and career ==
Born in Taranto, Ferruzzo started her career on stage when she was 18 years old. In 2000, she made her film debut in Denis Rabaglia's Azzurro, and in 2003, she had her breakout with Edoardo Winspeare's The Miracle. In 2017, she got a Nastro d'Argento nomination for Best Supporting Actress thanks to her performance in Fabio Mollo's There Is a Light. Ferruzzo is also active on television, appearing in popular series such as Distretto di Polizia, La squadra and RIS Delitti Imperfetti.

=== Personal life ===
In 2018, Ferruzzo married the actor Massimo Wertmüller. They have no children.

== Selected filmography ==
- Azzurro, directed by Denis Rabaglia (2000)
- The Miracle, directed by Edoardo Winspeare (2003)
- Saimir, directed by Francesco Munzi (2004)
- Along the Ridge, directed by Kim Rossi Stuart (2005)
- Little Sea, directed by Alessandro Di Robilant (2009)
- Cado dalle nubi, directed by Gennaro Nunziante (2009)
- Islands, directed by Stefano Chiantini (2011)
- The Fifth Wheel, directed by Giovanni Veronesi (2013)
- Black Souls, directed by Francesco Munzi (2014)
- Burning Love, directed by Alberto Caviglia (2015)
- There Is a Light, directed by Fabio Mollo (2017)
- Rainbow: A Private Affair, directed by Paolo and Vittorio Taviani (2017)
- Wherever You Are, directed by Bonifacio Angius (2018)
- Baggio: The Divine Ponytail, directed by Letizia Lamartire (2021)
- Jumping from High Places, directed by Andrea Jublin (2022)
- Palazzina Laf, directed by Michele Riondino (2023)
- Dieci minuti, directed by Maria Sole Tognazzi (2024)
- La Storia, directed by Francesca Archibugi (TV, 2024)
