= Swiss people in Italy =

Total population
- 50,170, 8,153 of those without Italian citizenship (DFAE: 2020, ISTAT: 2020)

Regions with significant populations
- Lombardy; Tuscany; Piedmont

Languages
- Italian; German; French; Romansh

Religion
- Protestant Church; Catholic Church

The presence of Swiss people in Italy is especially on the border, Campione d'Italia and in Milan.

== Numbers ==
In 2021 in Italy there are 8,153 regular citizens from Switzerland. The three cities with most number of Swiss people are: Milan, Rome and Florence.

Between 2008 and 2019 1,723 Swiss citizens acquired Italian citizenship.

== Notable Swiss people in Italy ==
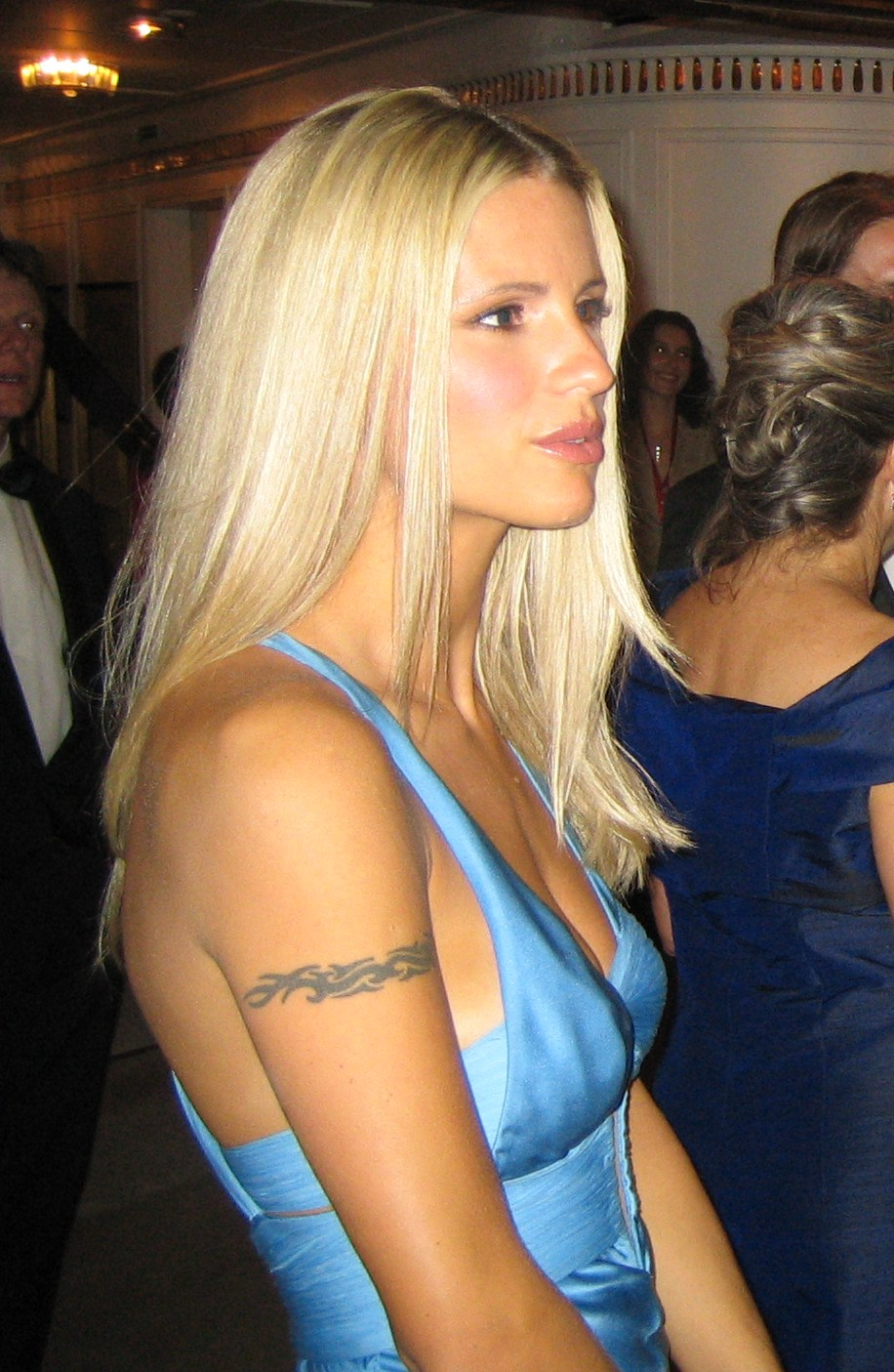
Michelle Hunziker

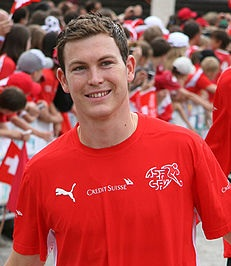
Stephan Lichtsteiner

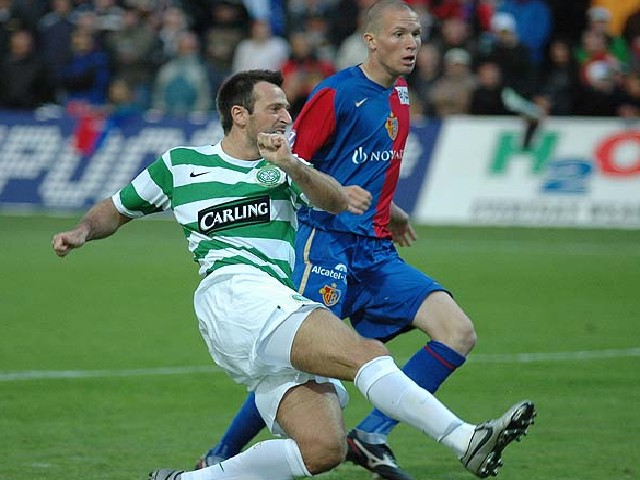
Michel Morganella

- Oscar Collodo (1958), rugby footballer
- Michelle Hunziker (1977), television presenter, model, actress
- Stephan Lichtsteiner (1984), footballer
- Michel Morganella (1989), footballer

== See also ==
- Italy–Switzerland relations
- Italian immigration to Switzerland
- Swiss Italian
- Swiss diaspora
- Immigration to Italy
