= Schweizerisches Jugendschriftenwerk =

Swiss youth literature publisher

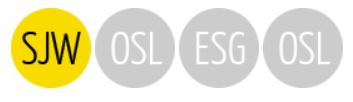
- Abbreviation: SJW
- Formation: 1931
- Type: Non-profit foundation
- Purpose: Publication and distribution of affordable youth literature
- Official language: National languages

The Schweizerisches Jugendschriftenwerk (SJW; French: Œuvre suisse des lectures pour la jeunesse, OSL; Italian: Edizioni svizzere per la gioventù, ESG) is a Swiss publisher of youth literature founded in 1931 by figures associated with the progressive education movement. The association established itself first in German-speaking Switzerland, then from 1935 in the French-speaking part, and after 1941 in Italian-speaking and Romansh-speaking areas as well.

== History ==
Initially conceived as a "campaign against the devil of trashy literature" (Schundliteratur), in the words of Otto Binder, the organization also served nationalist pedagogical aims from the late 1930s; according to a 1938 slogan, it sought to provide "healthy, native reading material for our youth". After 1945, direct distribution through teachers made the SJW booklets one of the principal instruments of reading promotion. In 1957 the SJW was reorganized into a non-profit foundation, with the goal of "publishing good and affordable youth literature in all national languages, as well as distributing it throughout the country".

The publishing program is tailored to three target groups: lower, middle, and upper school levels. By 2006, around 2,300 titles had appeared across all national languages, peaking in the 1960s, and roughly 50 million booklets had been sold in total. The 2006 program included, alongside traditional print media, translations on CD-ROM in Tamil, Serbian, Albanian, and other languages spoken by migrants.

== Bibliography ==
- OSL, Rapport annuel, 1931/1932–
- O. Binder, "Das schweizerische Jugendschriftenwerk", in Pro Juventute, 1932, no. 1, 3–8
- F. Brunner, 50 Jahre Schweizerisches Jugendschriftenwerk (SJW), 1931–1981, [1981]
- NZZ, 23 May 2006
- Ch. Linsmayer, Un Grutli spirituel pour la jeunesse suisse, 2007
