= Quiet Bliss =

- Film poster
- Directed by: Edoardo Winspeare
- Starring: Celeste Casciaro; Laura Licchetta; Anna Boccadamo
- Release date: 8 February 2014 (BIFF)
- Running time: 127 minutes
- Country: Italy

Quiet Bliss (Italian: In grazia di Dio) is a 2014 Italian drama film directed by Edoardo Winspeare. The film premiered at the 2014 Berlin International Film Festival.
