= Swiss Italian =

Variety of Italian

- Italiano svizzero (Italian)
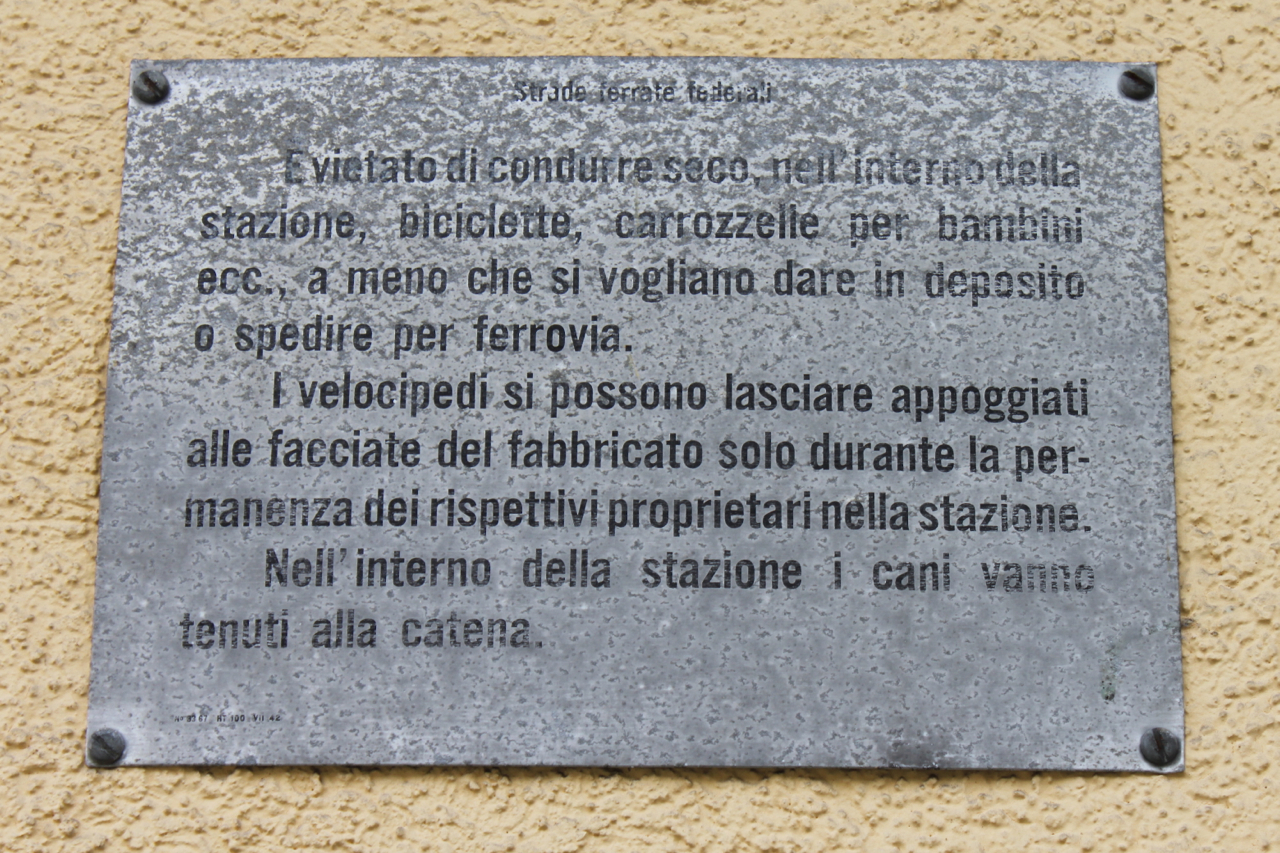
- An old sign in Faido printed in Italian text
- Native to: Switzerland
- Ethnicity: Swiss
- Native speakers: 720,000 (2019 census); L2: 2 million
- Language family: Indo-European: Italic; Romance; Italo-Dalmatian; Italo-Romance; Italian; Swiss Italian

Official status
- Official language in: Switzerland

Language codes
- ISO 639-3: –
- Glottolog: None
- IETF: it-CH
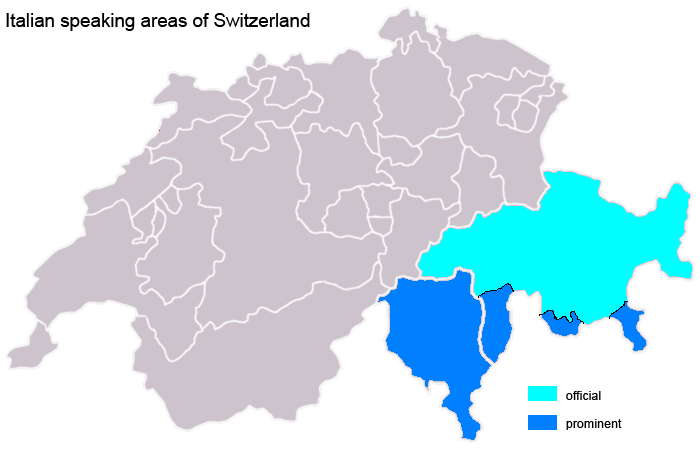
- A map showing the Italian-speaking areas of Switzerland: the two different shades of blue denote the two cantons where Italian is an official language; dark blue shows areas where Italian is spoken by the majority of the population.

Swiss Italian (Italian: italiano svizzero, Italian: [itaˈljaːno ˈzvittsero]) is the variety of the Italian language taught in the Italian-speaking area of Switzerland. While this variety is mainly spoken in the canton of Ticino and in the southern part of Grisons (about 270,000 native speakers), Italian is spoken natively in the whole country by about 700,000 people: Swiss Italians, Italian immigrants and Swiss citizens with Italian citizenship.

The Swiss variety of Italian is distinct from the traditional vernaculars of the Italian-speaking area, which are classified as varieties of the Gallo-Italic Lombard language.

== Status and usage ==
Italian, as the third Swiss national language, is spoken in Italian-speaking Switzerland (Ticino and the southern part of Grisons). It is an official language both at the federal level and in the two cantons of Ticino and Grisons.

Italian is also one of the most spoken languages in German-speaking Switzerland, and used as an idiom by Italian immigrants and their children. Italian is also used as a lingua franca between foreign workers of different nationalities, including Portuguese, Spanish, etc.

At the time of post-World War II Italian immigration to Switzerland, Italian was transmitted as a lingua franca in factories and on construction sites to non-Italian ethnic groups of foreign workers who subsequently settled in Switzerland. Italians were the pre-existing majority linguistic group, and the language was easy to learn for Spanish-speaking immigrants, leading to Italian becoming the dominant language among foreign workers. Later, Italian was also acquired by populations of other ethnic groups, for example by Greek speakers or groups from Yugoslavia, encouraged by the greater ease of learning in informal contexts and also by the fact that the knowledge of Italian by German-Swiss and French-Swiss is generally much higher than the knowledge of Italian in Germany or France. Today, the use of Italian as a lingua franca among workers in Switzerland is in decline.

There are some variations between Swiss Italian and the Italian language in Italy. While the use of local minority languages and dialects leads to distinct regional differences within languages, Swiss Italian is generally quite similar to the Italian language in Italy, with differences that are easy to trace and understand. Some Helvetisms have recently been included in the dictionaries of the Italian language. Linguistic misunderstandings between Italians and Swiss Italians are generally rare, but possible.

== Characteristics ==
The presence of calques from French and German means that there are some differences in vocabulary between the standard registers of the Italian language used in Italy and Switzerland. An example would be the words for driving licence: in Italy, it is called a patente di guida but in Swiss Italian, it becomes licenza di condurre, from the French permis de conduire. Another example is the interurban bus: in Italy it would be autobus or corriera but in Switzerland, it is the Autopostale or posta.

Another notable difference is the use of the word germanico to refer to German people, instead of tedesco. However, as in Italy, the word tedesco is used to refer to the German language. In Italy, the word germanico is used in the same sense as the word "Germanic" in English, referring, for example, to Germanic languages in general.

Radiotelevisione Svizzera di lingua Italiana is the main Swiss public broadcasting network in the Italian speaking regions of Switzerland. The University of Lugano is the major university of the Italian speaking part of Switzerland.

There are almost no differences in the vowels of Swiss Italian and mainland Italian.

Swiss Italian, similar to varieties of Italian in northern Italy and San Marino, lacks syntactic gemination.

== Examples ==
Some examples of Ticinese words that are different from Italian are:

| Swiss Italian | Standard Italian | English Translation | Notes |
|---|---|---|---|
| azione | promozione, offerta speciale | special offer, sale | from German Aktion |
| bucalettere | cassetta postale | mailbox, letter box | |
| chifer | brioche, croissant, cornetto | croissant | from Old High German kipfa, or chipf, known as Kipferl in Austria |
| classare | classificare | to classify | |
| comandare | ordinare | to order (at a bar or restaurant) | from French commander |
| evidente | facile | easy | from French évident |
| fotbalino | calcio-balilla | table football | |
| fuoco | focolare | hearth | |
| grippe | influenza | flu, influenza | from both German Grippe and French grippe |
| guidovia | guardrail, guardavia, sicurvia, guardastrada | guardrail, crash barrier, traffic barrier | perhaps derived from English guiderail. |
| isolazione | isolamento | insulation | |
| laborantina | laboratorista | laboratory assistant, technician | |
| licenza di condurre | patente di guida | driver’s/driving license | |
| licenziato | laureato | graduated (from a university) | false friend: in Italian licenziato means dismissed from a job, fired |
| medicamento | medicinale, farmaco | drug, medicine | from French médicament |
| messa a giorno | aggiornamento | update | from French mise à jour |
| natel | smartphone | smartphone | Is a generic trademark used in both Switzerland and in Liechtenstein for 'mobile phone'. |
| nota | voto | grade (accomplishment in school) | false friend: in Italian nota means school reprimand, notice or note (music), from German (Schul-)note |
| numerizzato | numerato | numbered | |
| ordinatore | calcolatore | computer | From French ordinateur. |
| permesso di dimora | permesso di soggiorno | residence permit | |
| pigione moderata | equo canone | rent control | from French loyer modéré |
| riservare | prenotare | to book, reserve | from French réserver |
| ritorno | resto | money change | from French retour |
| segno di valore | francobollo, marca da bollo | postage stamp | |
| sibla | bersaglio | target (of a weapon) | |
| soluzionare | risolvere | to solve | |
| vignetta | bollino, contrassegno | tag (a label to exhibit, typically in a car) | from French vignette |

== Data on Swiss Italian-speaking ==
There are about 720,000 residents who declare Italian as their main language, partly residing in the Italian-speaking linguistic area located south of the Alps and the rest scattered throughout the rest of the national territory, amounting to around 8.4% of the national population. Furthermore, 15% of the Swiss population uses it every day. Added to the latter are the more than two million people who, with often variable skills, speak or understand Italian as second language or foreign language.

Resident population according to main language(s)
| Categories | 1970 | 1980 | 1990 | 2000 | 2013 | 2014 |
|---|---|---|---|---|---|---|
| Total | 6,011,469 | 6,160,950 | 6,640,937 | 7,100,302 | 7,944,566 | 8,041,310 |
| German | 66.1% | 65.5% | 64.6% | 64.1% | 63.5% | 63.3% |
| French | 18.4% | 18.6% | 19.5% | 20.4% | 22.5% | 22.7% |
| Italian | 11% | 9.6% | 7.7% | 6.5% | 8.1% | 8.1% |
| Romansh | 0.8% | 0.8% | 0.6% | 0.5% | 0.5% | 0.5% |
| Other languages | 3.7% | 5.5% | 7.7% | 8.5% | 21.7% | 20.9% |

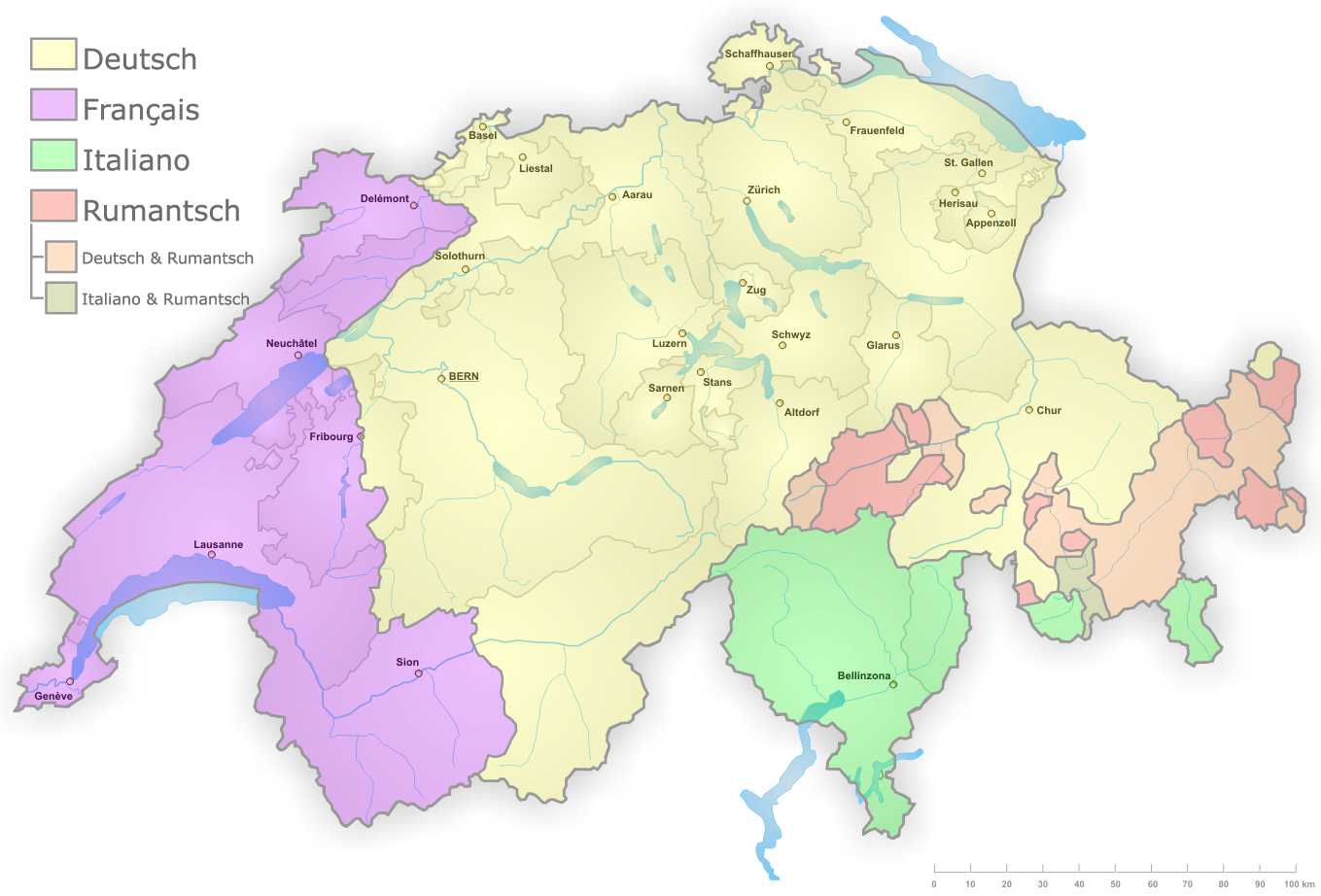
Linguistic map of Switzerland. In green, the areas with an Italian-speaking majority.

The data relating to the years 2013 and 2014 exceeds 100% because the interviewees had the possibility to indicate several languages spoken; for the same reason, a comparison with the previous data is not possible. The 2013 survey is the result of the new approach of the Federal Statistical Office, which by implementing the new population census plan integrates the decennial censuses with the structural surveys, to be carried out every three to five years. The aforementioned survey focuses on the mother tongue or mother tongues of bilingual subjects. In Ticino, the Italian language continued to enjoy good health, recording, among other things, a slight increase from the 1990 census to the 2000 census.

However, the decline in the teaching of Italian as a foreign language in the French- and German-speaking cantons is particularly striking. By way of example, it should be remembered that Italian, in the Canton of St. Gallen, is chosen as a subject by only 5% of high school students. In February 2011, the parliament of this German-speaking canton came to have to express itself on the almost total abolition of Italian as a foreign language in high schools. The proposal was ultimately rejected with consequent relief from the Council of State of Ticino.

== See also ==
- Languages of Switzerland
- Italian immigration to Switzerland
- Italy–Switzerland relations
- Swiss French
- Swiss German
- Swiss Standard German
- Ticinese dialect
