= Languages of Switzerland =

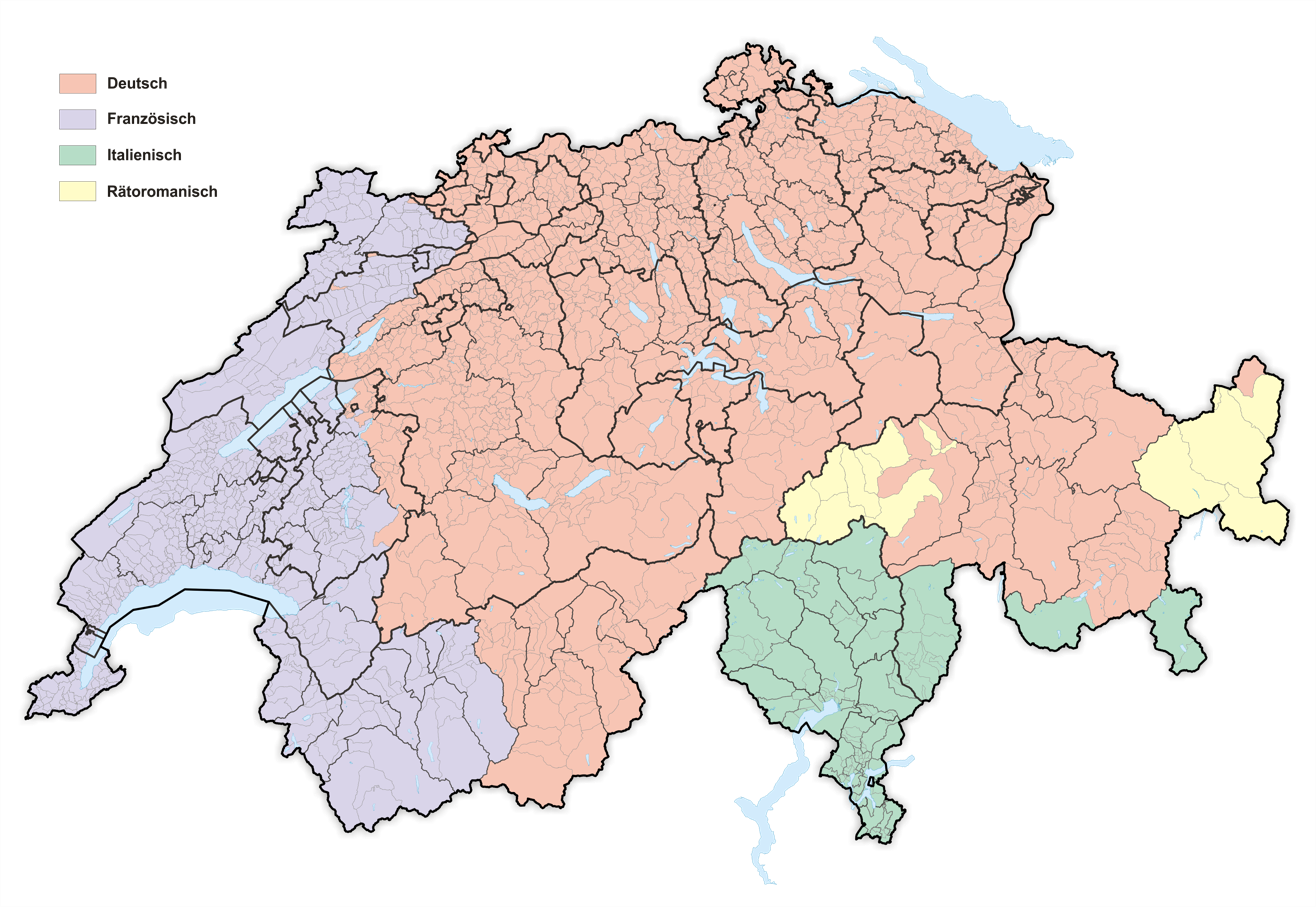
- Official: German, French, Italian, Romansh
- National: German 62% (2021); French 22.7% (2021); Italian 8.2% (2021); Romansh 0.5% (2021)
- Vernacular: Swiss German, Swiss Standard German, Swiss French, Swiss Italian, Franco-Provençal, Lombard, Walser German, Frainc-Comtou, Bavarian
- Immigrant: English 5.4%; Portuguese 3.7%; Albanian 3.2%; Serbo-Croatian 2.5%; Spanish 2.4%; others 7.7%
- Foreign: English
- Signed: Swiss German Sign Language, French Sign Language, Italian Sign Language
- Keyboard layout: QWERTZ
- Source: FSO

The four national languages of Switzerland are German, French, Italian, and Romansh. German, French, and Italian maintain equal status as official languages at the national level within the federal administration of the Swiss Confederation, while Romansh is used in dealings with people who speak it. Latin is occasionally used in some formal contexts, particularly to denote the country (Confoederatio Helvetica).

In 2020, 62.3% of the population of Switzerland were native speakers of German (either Swiss or Standard German) at home; 22.8% French (mostly Swiss French, but including some Franco-Provençal dialects); 8% Italian (mostly Swiss Italian, but including Lombard); and 0.5% Romansh. The German region (Deutschschweiz) is roughly in the east, north, and centre; the French part (la Romandie) in the west; and the Italian area (Svizzera italiana) in the south. There remains a small Romansh-speaking native population in Grisons in the east. The cantons of Fribourg, Bern, and Valais are officially bilingual; Grisons is officially trilingual.

English is widely spoken as a second language across Switzerland, and many Anglophone migrants live in Switzerland. It is often used as a lingua franca as Switzerland has four official languages. Because of this, English is often used in advertisements in Switzerland, and many businesses and companies in Switzerland, even if they only operate domestically, have names that use English words.

== History ==
The main languages of Swiss residents from 1950 to 2015, also continuing in percentages, were as follows:

Overview of the native language of Swiss
Year	German	French	Italian	Romansh	Other
2015	63.7	22.7	8.4	0.6	5.3
2000	63.7	20.4	6.5	0.5	9.0
1990	63.6	19.2	7.6	0.6	8.9
1980	65.0	18.4	9.8	0.8	6.0
1970	64.9	18.1	11.9	0.8	4.3
1960	69.4	18.9	9.5	0.9	1.4
1950	72.1	20.3	5.9	1.0	0.7

In the 2012 survey, for the first time, respondents could indicate more than one language, causing the percentages to exceed 100%.

== Federal authorities ==
While the National Council offers simultaneous translation to and from German, French and Italian, the Council of States does not translate debates – its members are expected to understand at least German and French.

Employees of the federal government are expected to write documents in their native tongue. 77% of the original official documents were edited in German, 20% in French, and 1.98% in Italian. More than half of the Italian speakers employed by the federal government are translators.

The Federal Supreme Court publishes its decisions only in one language, usually in the language used in the earlier instance. The so-called regest – a summary of the decision – will be offered in German, French and Italian, but only in important and influential cases (German "Leitentscheide").

== National languages and linguistic regions ==
=== German ===
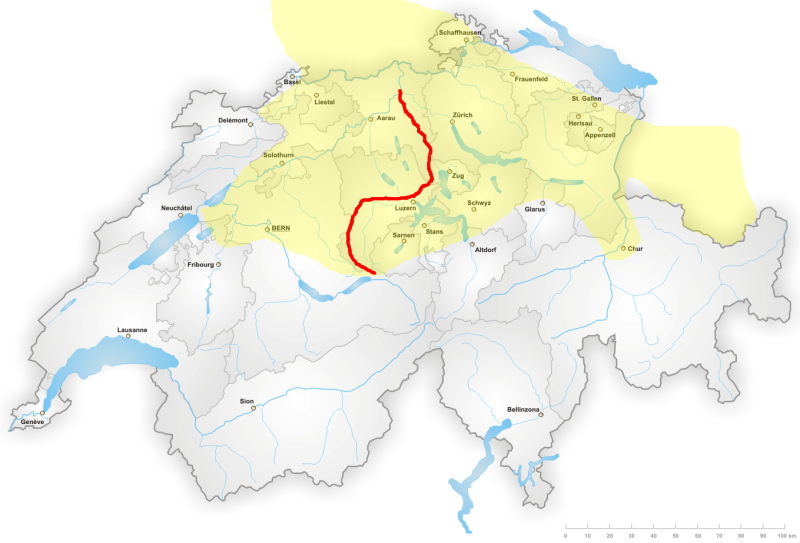
Distribution of High Alemannic dialects. Marked in red is the Brünig-Napf-Reuss line.

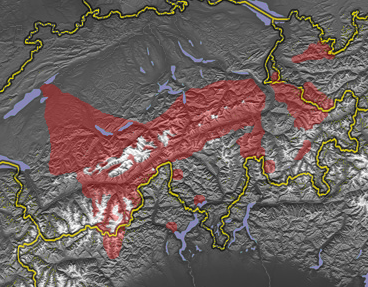
Distribution of Highest Alemannic dialects

The German-speaking part of Switzerland (German: Deutschschweiz, French: Suisse alémanique, Italian: Svizzera tedesca, Romansh: Svizra tudestga) constitutes about 65% of Switzerland (North Western Switzerland, Eastern Switzerland, Central Switzerland, most of the Swiss Plateau and the greater part of the Swiss Alps).

In seventeen of the Swiss cantons, German is the only official language (Aargau, Appenzell Ausserrhoden, Appenzell Innerrhoden, Basel-Stadt, Basel-Landschaft, Glarus, Luzern, Nidwalden, Obwalden, Schaffhausen, Schwyz, Solothurn, St. Gallen, Thurgau, Uri, Zug, and Zürich).

In the cantons of Bern, Fribourg and Valais, French is co-official; in the trilingual canton of Graubünden, more than half of the population speaks German, while the rest speak Romansh or Italian. In each case, all languages are official languages of the respective canton.

While the French-speaking Swiss prefer to call themselves Romands and their part of the country is Romandy, the German-speaking Swiss used to (and, colloquially, still do) refer to the French-speaking Swiss as "Welsche", and to their area as Welschland, which has the same etymology as the English Welsh (see Walha). Research shows that individuals with a French-sounding name in the German-speaking part suffer from social discrimination.

Nevertheless, in 2017, 11.1%, or about 920,600 of the Swiss residents speak Standard German ("Hochdeutsch") at home, but this figure likely includes numerous German (and Austrian) immigrants.

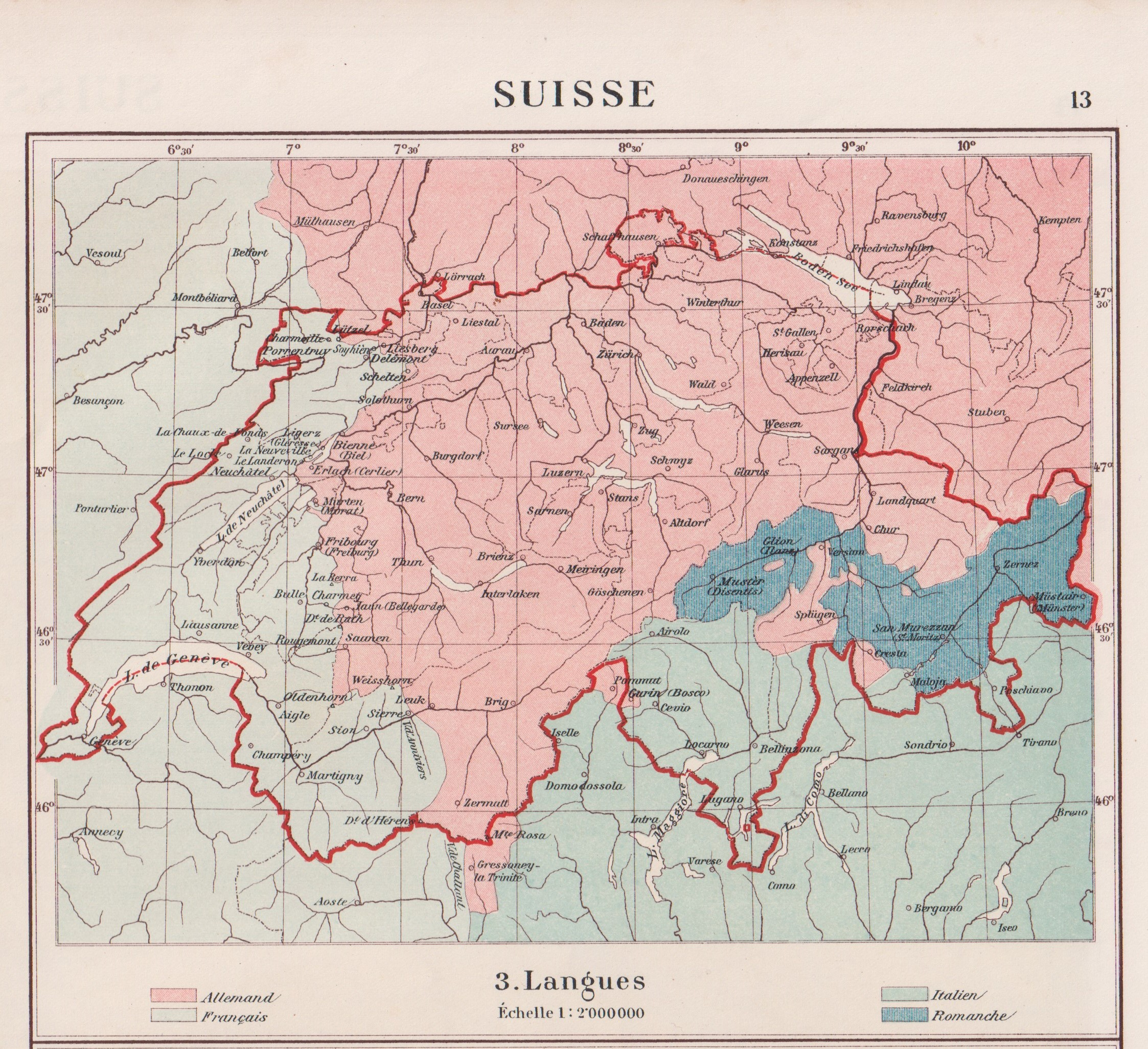
Geography of languages in Switzerland in the early 20th century. Page from a school atlas, in the Jewish Museum of Switzerland's collection.

By the Middle Ages, a marked difference had developed within the German-speaking part of Switzerland between the rural cantons (Uri, Schwyz, Unterwalden, Glarus, Zug, Appenzell, Schaffhausen) and the city cantons (Lucerne, Berne, Zurich, Solothurn, Fribourg, Basel, St. Gallen), divided by views about trade and commerce. After the Reformation, all cantons were either Catholic or Protestant, and the denominational influences on culture added to the differences. Even today, when all cantons are somewhat denominationally mixed, the different historical denominations can be seen in the mountain villages, where Roman Catholic Central Switzerland abounds with chapels and statues of saints, and the farmhouses in the very similar landscape of the Protestant Bernese Oberland show Bible verses carved on the housefronts instead.

In addition to this more widespread notion of Swiss German dialect, there is also Walser German, another Highest Alemannic speech brought by Walser emigrants from Valais.

Because German is the dominant language in Switzerland, many Swiss people whose first languages are French, Italian, or Romansh move into the German-speaking regions. Consequently, their children, born in these predominantly German-speaking areas, usually grow up speaking German as their primary language.

=== French ===
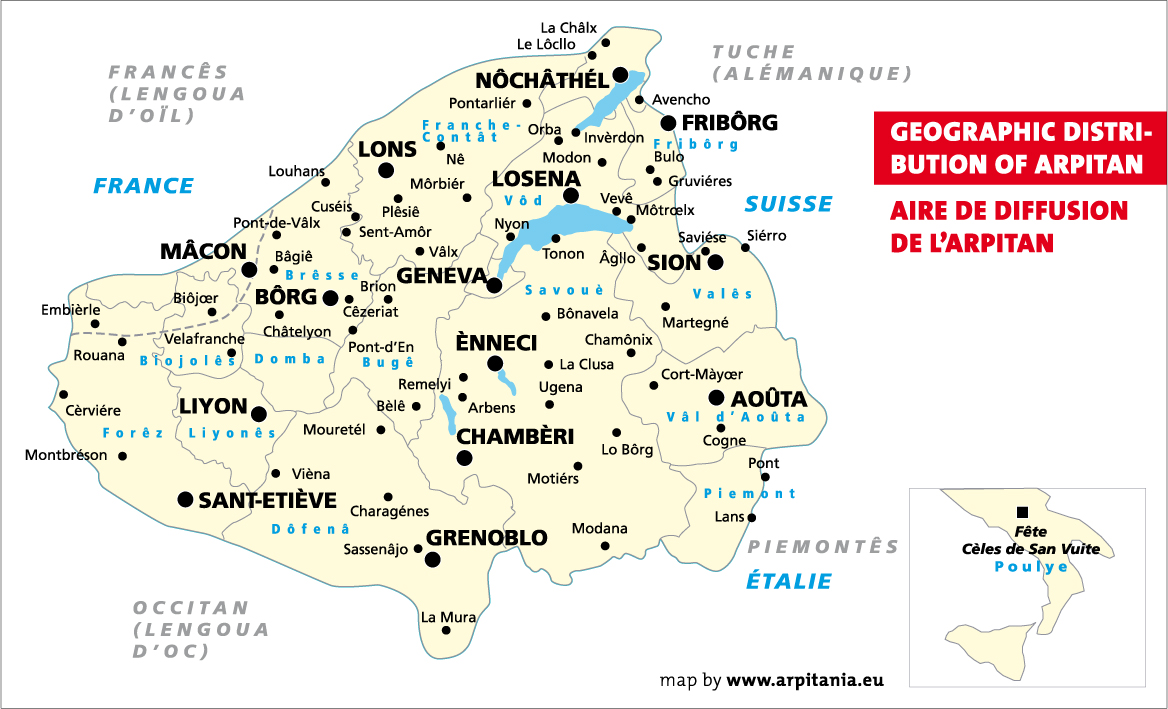
Arpitan language area map with place names in Arpitan and historic political divisions

Romandy (French: Romandie, la Suisse romande, German: Romandie, Welschland, Welschschweiz, or in some contexts: Westschweiz, (Note: "Welsch" is an old German word for "Foreign" and is the same word the Anglo-Saxons used for the original British inhabitants which today are the Welsh people.) Italian: Svizzera romanda) is the French-speaking part of Switzerland. It covers the area of the cantons of Geneva, Vaud, Neuchâtel, and Jura as well as the French-speaking parts of the cantons of Bern (German-speaking majority), Valais (French-speaking majority), and Fribourg (French-speaking majority). 1.9 million people (or 24.4% of the Swiss population) live in Romandy. In 2020, around 2 million people, or 22.8% of the population, in Switzerland spoke French as their primary language, and 28% of the population used French most often at work.

Standard Swiss French and the French of France are highly mutually intelligible, though some differences exist. For example, like most Francophone Belgians, speakers of Swiss French use septante (seventy) instead of soixante-dix (literally, "sixty ten") and nonante (ninety) instead of "quatre-vingt-dix" ("four twenty ten"). In the cantons of Vaud, Valais and Fribourg, speakers use huitante (eighty) instead of "quatre-vingts" (four twenties) used in most of the rest of the French-speaking world; the cantons of Geneva, Bern and Jura use "quatre-vingts". "Sou" is used throughout Romandy for a 5-centime coin, as is "tune" (or "thune") when referring to a 5-Swiss-franc piece. Swiss French also uses "déjeuner, dîner, souper" for breakfast, lunch and dinner instead of "petit-déjeuner, déjeuner, dîner" used in France.

Historically, the vernacular language used by inhabitants of most parts of Romandy was Franco-Provençal. Franco-Provençal (also called Arpitan) is a language sometimes considered to be halfway between the langue d'oïl (the historical language of northern France and ancestor of French) and Occitan (the langue d'oc, spoken in southern France). Standard French and Franco-Provençal/Arpitan, linguistically, are distinct and mutual intelligibility is limited. Increasingly, Franco-Provençal/Arpitan is used only by members of the older generations. In parts of Jura Franc-Comtois dialects are also spoken; these belong to the same Oïl bloc as Standard French.

The term Romandy does not formally exist in the political system, but is used to distinguish and unify the French-speaking population of Switzerland. The television channel Télévision Suisse Romande (TSR) served the Romande community across Switzerland and worldwide through TV5Monde until it was merged with the Radio Suisse Romande (RSR) and renamed RTS (Radio Télévision Suisse) in 2010.

=== Italian ===
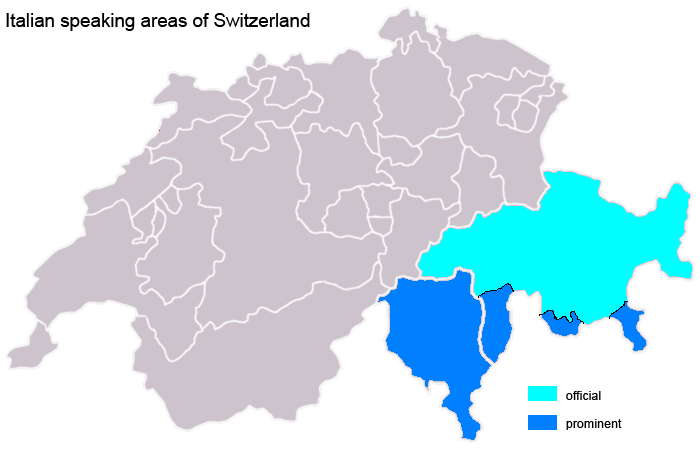
Italian language in Switzerland

Italian Switzerland (Italian: Svizzera italiana, Romansh: Svizra taliana, French: Suisse italienne, German: italienische Schweiz) is the Italian-speaking part of Switzerland, which includes the canton of Ticino and the southern part of Grisons. Italian is also spoken in the Gondo Valley (leading to the Simplon Pass, on the southern part of the watershed) in Valais. The traditional vernacular of this region is the Lombard language, specifically its Ticinese dialect.

The linguistic region covers an area of about 3,500 km^{2} and has a total population of around 350,000, with the number of Italophones residing in Switzerland being 545,274 (about 7% of the Swiss population).

The proportion of Italian-speaking inhabitants had been decreasing since the 1970s, after reaching a high of 12% of the population during the same decade. This was entirely because of the reduced number of immigrants from Italy to Switzerland. However it has increased again during the last decade.

=== Romansh ===
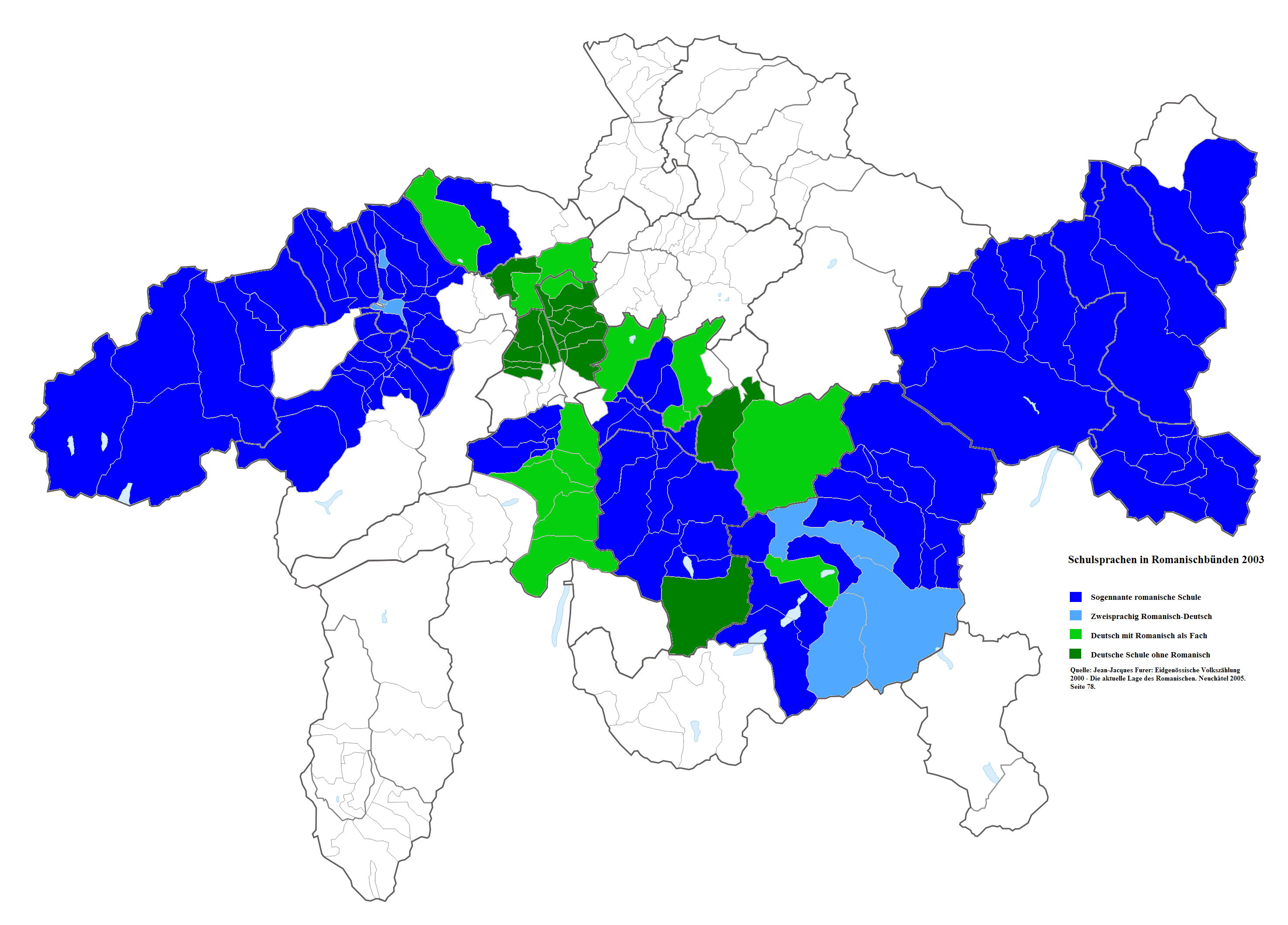
Languages of instruction in the traditionally Romansh-speaking areas of Grisons as of 2003 Romansh school Bilingual Romansh-German school German school, Romansh as a subject German schooling only

Romansh is an official language in the trilingual Canton of Grisons, where the municipalities in turn are free to specify their own official languages. Romansh has been recognized as one of four "national languages" by the Swiss Federal Constitution since 1938. It was also declared an "official language" of the Confederation in 1996, meaning that Romansh speakers may use their language for correspondence with the federal government and expect to receive a Romansh response. Although Romansh is split into several dialects, the federal and cantonal authorities use the standardized version (Romansh Grischun) exclusively.

Romansh speakers remain predominant in the Surselva, the Albula Region, and the Engiadina Bassa/Val Müstair Region.

== English ==
Many Swiss find it easier to use English as a lingua franca with other Swiss people of different linguistic backgrounds. In 2022, Switzerland ranked 23rd in Europe in the English Proficiency Index of EF language school.

Swissinfo, a multilingual outlet of Swiss Radio and Television, reported in 2021 that interview subjects are often asked technical questions in English, given that interviewers are often not proficient enough to do so in the local language. The interviewees then answer in their own local language. The interviews are later translated and dubbed over at the studio. A 2003 study on the online communication behavior of Swiss medical students showed that they quickly changed to English as soon as students from other languages were involved. The main drivers behind using English were the Italian-speaking students from Ticino, as students from other parts of the country rarely understood their messages.

While university courses in science are often held in English, in 2014 the Canton of Zug introduced an English dual education course for future commerce and information technology professionals, which came at the request of multinational companies like Glencore and Roche. Before, only Geneva offered dual education in English.

A survey carried out in 2023 showed that 6.4 percent of the Swiss inhabitants mainly speak English, while 23 percent of the working population usually speak English on the job.

Inhabitants who mainly speak English in everyday life
Area	Percentage
Canton of Zug	14.1
Walchwil, village in the Canton of Zug	27.3
City of Zug	20.0
Canton of Basel-City	12.5
Canton of Geneva	11.8
Canton of Zurich	10.8
Residents aged 15 or above; according to 2022 census data

In advertising and sports, English slogans and labels are frequently used, as it reduces the need for regional branding. For example, Swiss railways sell tourism offers through the "RailAway" label since 1999, and many national sport federations have English names (e.g. Swiss Olympic and Swiss Super League), with their German or French names almost never being used.

== Other languages ==
=== Franco-Provençal and Lombard ===
Besides the national languages and the many varieties of Swiss German, several regional Romance languages are spoken natively in Switzerland: Franco-Provençal and Lombard.

=== Sinte ===
About 20,000 Romani speak Sinte, an Indic language.

The logo of the Swiss Federal administration, in the four national languages of Switzerland

=== Sign languages ===
Five sign languages are used: Swiss-German, French, Italian, Austrian, and German.

Language in Switzerland (Note: Since 2010, statistics of languages in Switzerland provided by the Swiss Federal Statistical Office are based on a national structural survey of 200,000 people aged 15 years and older (corresponding to 2.5% of the total resident population). Data are extrapolated to obtain statistical results for the whole population (aged 15 years and older). These results are estimates subject to some degree of uncertainty indicated by a confidence interval. Therefore, the figures of the structural survey may not be entirely comparable to data collection before 2010 based on census figures (counting every person living in Switzerland).)
Language	2000 Mother tongue		2015 Main language		2018 Main language		2020 Main language	
Language	Number	%	Number	%	Number	%	Number	%
German	4,639,762	63.7%	4,424,150	64%	4,458,156	62.9%	4,477,946	62.3%
French	1,484,411	20.4%	1,567,197	22.7%	1,619,708	22.9%	1,624,424	22.6%
Italian	470,961	6.5%	581,381	8.4%	593,646	8.4%	575,017	8%
Romansh	35,072	0.5%	40,299	0.6%	36,709	0.5%	35,938	0.5%
English	73,422	1%	374,642	5.4%	471,056	5.9%	416,887	5.8%
Portuguese	89,527	1.2%	256,560	3.7%			251,570	3.5%
Albanian	94,937	1.3%	188,125	2.7%			230,007	3.2%
Serbo-Croatian	103,350	1.4%	161,882	2.3%			165,317	2.3%
Spanish	76,750	1.1%	159,859	2.3%			172,505	2.4%
Turkish	44,523	0.6%	78,015	1.1%				
Arabic	14,345	0.2%	36,857	0.5%				
Russian	8,570	0.1%	32,244	0.5%				
Tamil	21,816	0.3%	31,145	0.5%				
Polish	5,206	0.1%	24,881	0.4%				
Dutch	11,840	0.2%	22,357	0.3%				
Hungarian	6,194	0.1%	20,597	0.3%				
Kurdish	7,531	0.1%	19,401	0.3%				
Thai	7,569	0.1%	14,528	0.2%				
Greek	4,792	0.1%	13,763	0.2%				
Czech	5,444	0.1%	13,433	0.2%				
Romanian	3,397	0%	12,738	0.2%				
Chinese	8,279	0.1%	12,324	0.2%				
Slovak	2,018	0%	12,072	0.2%				
Persian	3,467	0%	11,108	0.2%				
Macedonian	6,415	0.1%	10,698	0.2%				
Swedish	5,560	0.1%	8,771	0.1%				
Vietnamese	4,226	0.1%	6,720	0.1%				
Tagalog	3,019	0%	6,275	0.1%				
Japanese	4,100	0.1%	6,001	0.1%				
Danish	2,739	0%	5,272	0.1%				
Tibetan	1,108	0%	5,219	0.1%				
Bulgarian	1,579	0%	4,583	0.1%				
Finnish	2,628	0%	4,299	0.1%				
Hindi-Urdu	1,407	0%	3,846	0.1%				
Slovene	1,601	0%	3,690	0.1%				
Somali	2,661	0%	3,607	0.1%				
Aramaic	1,333	0%	2,465	0%				
Hebrew	1,176	0%	2,159	0%				
Norwegian	1,361	0%	2,108	0%				
Korean	1,202	0%	1,816	0%				
Other languages			77,751	1.1%	1,255,656	17.7%	589,393	8.2%

== Neo-Latin ==
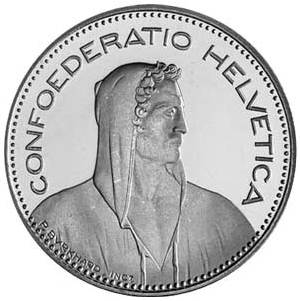
A Swiss five-franc coin with the Latin inscription Confoederatio Helvetica

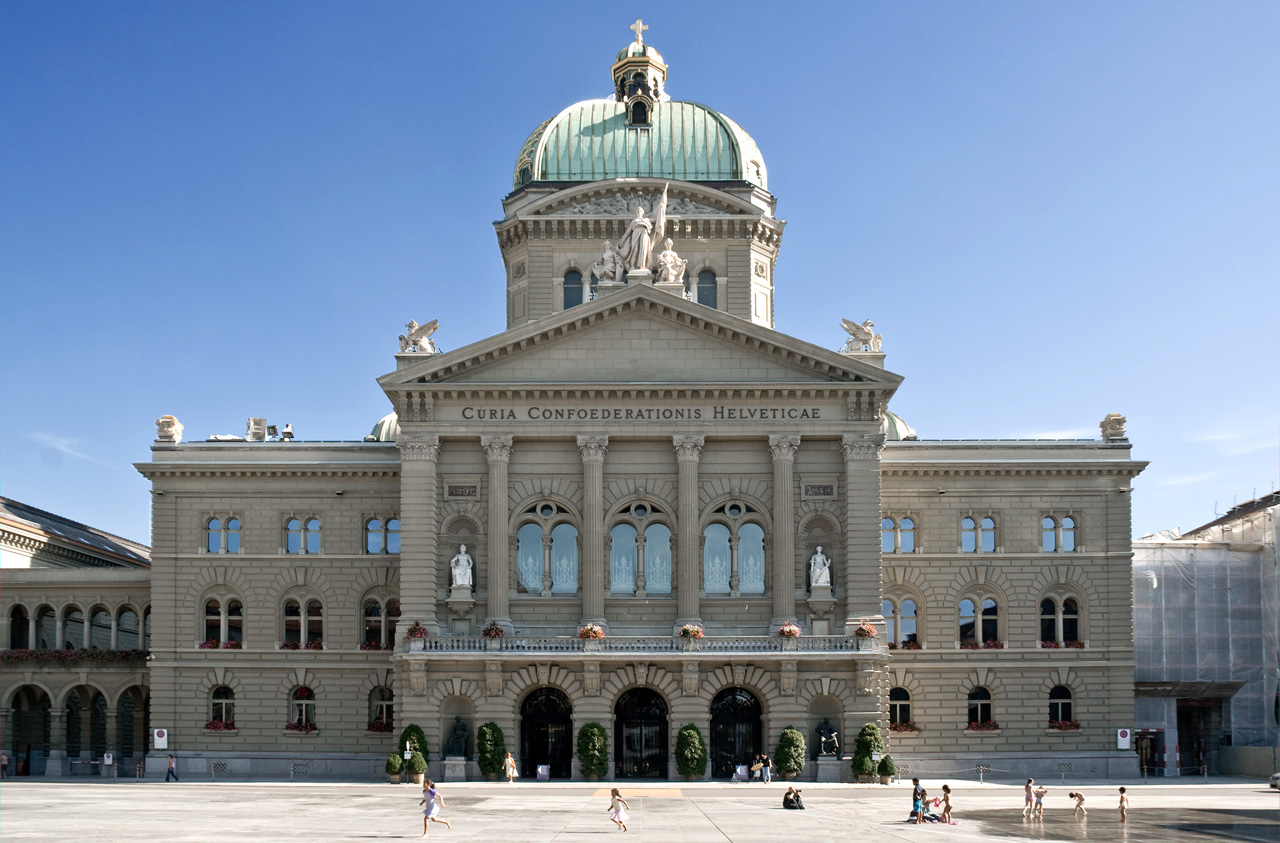
The Federal Palace of Switzerland, with the Latin inscription Curia Confoederationis Helveticae

To avoid having to translate the name of Switzerland into the four national languages, (Note: When there is no room to use the four official languages, unlike on the banknotes of the Swiss franc, on the logo of the Federal administration of Switzerland and on the Swiss passport.) Latin is used on the coins of the Swiss franc (Helvetia or Confoederatio Helvetica) and on Swiss stamps (Helvetia). The country code top-level domain for Switzerland on the internet is .ch, the abbreviation of the Latin name, Confoederatio Helvetica (Swiss Confederation); similarly, the International vehicle registration code for Swiss automobiles is "CH". The Federal Palace of Switzerland bears the inscription Curia Confoederationis Helveticae.

To have a unique name across the country (without favoring German, French or any other language), several Swiss foundations and associations have Latin names, such as Pro Helvetia, Pro Infirmis, Pro Juventute, Pro Natura, Pro Patria, Pro Senectute, Pro Specie Rara, Helvetia Nostra, and many more.

== See also ==
- Swiss people
- Demographics of Switzerland
- Röstigraben, referring to the asserted difference in mentality between German Swiss and the French-speaking Romands
- Swiss literature
- List of multilingual countries and regions
