= The Miracle (2003 film) =

2003 drama film

- Directed by: Edoardo Winspeare
- Screenplay by: Giorgia Cecere; Pierpaolo Pirone
- Cinematography: Paolo Carnera
- Edited by: Luca Benedetti
- Music by: Donatello Pisanello; Cinzia Marzo; Officina Zoè
- Distributed by: 01 Distribution
- Release date: 2003
- Language: Italian

The Miracle (Italian: Il miracolo) is a 2003 Italian drama film directed by Edoardo Winspeare.

The film premiered in the main competition section at the 60th edition of the Venice Film Festival. It was a surprise hit at the Italian box office.

== Cast ==
- Claudio D'Agostino as Tonio
- Carlo Bruni as Pietro
- Anna Ferruzzo as Annalisa
- Stefania Casciaro as Cinzia
- Angelo Gamarro as Nonno
- Rosario Sambito as Sarino
- Frank Crudele as Masi
