= Nico Cirasola =

Italian film director (1951–2023)

- Born: 27 May 1951; Gravina in Puglia, Italy
- Died: 3 April 2023 (aged 71); Rome, Italy
- Occupations: Film director, screenwriter, producer and actor

Nico Cirasola (27 May 1951 – 3 April 2023) was an Italian film director, screenwriter, producer and actor.

== Life and career ==
Born in Gravina in Puglia, a film buff since childhood, in 1982 Cirasola wrote the book Da Angelo Musco a Massimo Troisi - Il cinema comico meridionale ("From Angelo Musco to Massimo Troisi - The Southern Comedy Cinema"). After directing the never completed Super 8 film Tuta blu, he made his official feature film debut in 1989 with the road movie Odore di pioggia, starring Renzo Arbore.

Cirasola's films were all self-produced independent productions, always set in Apulia, and often characterized by satirical and political commitments. His works include Bell’Epoker (2003), a satire about the 1991 Teatro Petruzzelli fire, Focaccia Blues (2009), a documentary about a successful focaccia shop in Altamura which forced the local McDonald's shop to close due to lack of customers, and Rudy Valentino - Divo dei divi (2017), a film starring Claudia Cardinale and Alessandro Haber about a little-known 1923 trip of Rudolph Valentino in his hometown. Cirasola was also active as a character actor.

== Filmography ==
As Actor

- Smell of Rain (Italian: Odore di pioggia) (1989)
- Un altro giorno ancora, (Italian: L'estate di Bobby Charlton) directed by Tonino Zangardi (1995)
- The Summer of Bobby Charlton, directed by Massimo Guglielmi (1995)
- My name is Nico Cirasola, (Italian: Il mio nome è Nico Cirasola) directed by Giovanni Piperno (1998), documentary
- Albania blues (2000)
- Sangue vivo, directed by Edoardo Winspeare (2000)
- Francesca and Nunziata, directed by Lina Wertmüller (2001), TV movie
- Bell'epoker (2003)
- Mr. Gi Bi (2010), (Italian: Signor Gi Bi) short film
- If you are like this I say yes (Italian: Se sei così ti dico sì), directed by Eugenio Cappuccio (2011)
- The Wholly Family, short film, directed by Terry Gilliam (2011)
- The confectioner (Italian: Il pasticciere), directed by Luigi Sardiello (2012)

As director and screenwriter

- Smell of Rain (Italian: Odore di pioggia) (1989)
- Stonde, Stonde, Seneca's nettles, an episode of the film Corsica (1991)
- Da do da (1994)
- Albania blues (2000)
- Bell'epoker (2003)
- Focaccia blues (2009)
- Mr. Gi Bi (2010), (Italian: Signor Gi Bi) short film
- Rudy Valentino - Star of stars (2017)

== Death ==
Cirasola died on 3 April 2023, at the age of 71.
