= The Brave Men =

Galantuomini
- Directed by: Edoardo Winspeare
- Starring: Donatella Finocchiaro; Fabrizio Gifuni; Giuseppe Fiorello
- Cinematography: Paolo Carnera
- Release date: 2008
- Language: Italian

Galantuomini (also known as Brave Men and Gentlemen) is a 2008 Italian crime drama film directed by Edoardo Winspeare. It entered the main competition at the 2008 Rome Film Festival, in which Donatella Finocchiaro was awarded best actress.

== Cast ==
- Donatella Finocchiaro: Lucia
- Fabrizio Gifuni: Ignazio
- Giuseppe Fiorello: Infantino
- Giorgio Colangeli: Carmine Za'
- Gioia Spaziani: Laura
