= Italy–Switzerland relations =

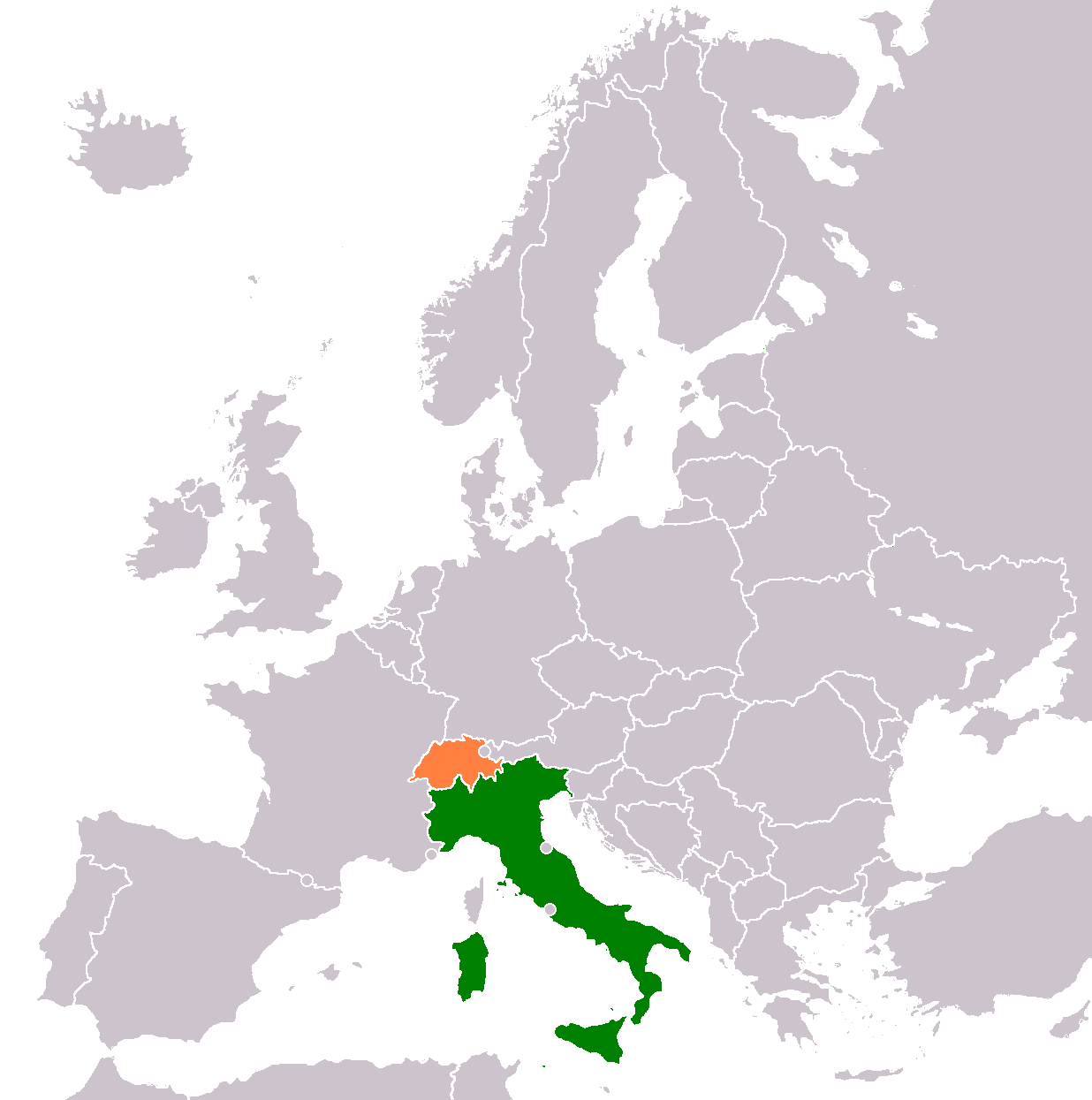
- Italy: Switzerland

Diplomatic relations between Italy and Switzerland have traditionally been close and are currently governed by a complex set of treaties (including those with the European Union (EU), of which Italy is a member).

The two countries share a long border, three common official languages (Italian is one of Switzerland's four official languages, German and French are recognised minority languages in Italy; moreover, Romansh is close to Ladin and Friulian, spoken in Northern Italy) and a regional language (Lombard spoken in Canton Ticino in Switzerland and Lombardy in Italy). Valtellina in the Lombardy region was part of Switzerland from 1512 to 1797. There are 48,000 Swiss in Italy and Italian citizens are the largest foreign group in Switzerland: 500,000 including those with dual citizenship. Switzerland was a popular destination for Italian emigrants in the 19th century and between 1950 and 1970 half of all foreigners in Switzerland were Italian. There are also more Swiss schools in Italy than any other country in the world.

Relations between the two countries are represented through a range of commercial, cultural and technological relationships.

Italy is not only the second largest trading partner in Europe, but also shares with the Federation a collaboration in migration. Cooperation strengthened by the better application of the Dublin Regulation, specifically on readmission matter.

A further step has been taken with the agreement on customs and police cooperation on cross-border control and security.

== History ==
Before the birth of the Italian state in 1861, the relations between Italian state entities and the Swiss territories were of an economic and religious nature. During 1300–1400, for example, Italian merchants and bankers participated at Geneva fairs contributing to their development.

Switzerland established Milan as a protectorate of the Confederation between 1512 and 1515. In 1515, the Swiss helped defend the Duchy of Milan against a French invasion.

In the period of Restoration (1815–1848) the Lombard Enlightenment had an important influence on the Swiss territories, Milan, in fact, became a place of education for the Ticinesi.

During the Revolutions of 1848 in the Italian states many Swiss supported the Italian cause, in particular, in the five days of Milan Swiss volunteers fought with the Lombardy-Venetia against the Austrians. Following the capture of Milan in August 1848 some Italian revolutionaries took refuge in Switzerland.

In the Risorgimento era, various Italian patriots, including Cavour, the prime minister of the Kingdom of Piedmont-Sardinia, became interested in conquering the Ticino Canton and the Italian-speaking valleys of Graubünden. The proclamation of the Kingdom of Italy in 1861 was perceived with relief by Switzerland, as it provided security for the country's neutrality.

Between 1870 and 1914, there was a large influx of Italian immigrants into Switzerland. This was encouraged by the 1868 treaty of domicile and consulate which ensured freedom of access and domicile in the respective countries. Italian immigrants constituted unskilled labour employed mainly for the construction of railways.

During the First World War, the Italian government was committed to respecting Swiss neutrality and after the war with the establishment of Fascism, bilateral relations were characterized by a policy based on friendship. The two countries concluded a new treaty of commerce (1923) and a treaty of conciliation and judicial regulation (1924).

As in the First World War also in the Second World War Italy recognized the neutrality of Switzerland in 1938, but among the expansion projects exposed by Mussolini on November 30, 1938, to the Great Council of Fascism there was also the Canton of Ticino.

With the end of the Second World War there was a wave of migration to Switzerland mainly due to the fact that the Swiss production system was not affected by the damage of war and Swiss entrepreneurs sought low-cost Italian labour. The Swiss government, however, tried to limit the migration to seasonal work and concluded an agreement in 1948. This agreement stated that workers could not move in Swiss territory and remained tied to those who had hired them. In addition, family reunification was not allowed. This agreement created several tensions between the two countries and for this reason another one was signed in 1964 that allowed reunification.

Following the oil crisis that began in 1973, many Italian workers in Switzerland returned to Italy.

== Business Relations ==
Italy is Switzerland's second largest trading partner and Switzerland is Italy's 8th largest investor (CHF 22bn) creating 78,000 jobs. The Lombardy Region represents 90% of all Switzerland's trading with Italy according to former federal councillor Ueli Maurer. Italy invests CHF 6bn in Switzerland and creates 13,000 jobs. The two are strongly integrated through the EU's treaties with Switzerland and Switzerland is also part of the EU's Schengen Area.

== History of Economic Relations ==
Trade relations between the two countries were favored by geographical proximity and their membership in the Latin Monetary Union. The opening of the Gotthard tunnel and the port of Geneva also favored relations.

The Italian protectionist turn in the 1970s led to a partial slowdown of trade relations, which created the condition for a revision of trade treaties. Although the revision took place, trade balance remained clearly in favor of Italy.

Until 1970, the Swiss market was the only one with which Italy benefited from a constant trade surplus, already at the beginning of the 20th century Swiss investors and companies gave important impulses to the peninsula.

Bilateral trade was not visibly affected by Italy's participation in war, a clear sign was the opening of Swiss Chamber of Commerce in Italy in 1919. This period was also characterized by a relative decrease in Swiss imports from Italy although exports remained constant, this turned out on the reduction of trade balance favorable to Italy.

After the war in Ethiopia, the Swiss financial center and in particular the credit institutions, played a central role in the transfer of credit to Italy.

The end of the Second World War gave a new start to bilateral trade:

In 1950, both countries joined the European Payments Union. As a result, new trade agreements and payment methods led to a new period of liberalization of bilateral trade and stability in terms of trade volume.

This period is featured by a large amount of investment from the Confederation to the peninsula:

- The Swiss financial center stood out for its fundamental role in the assignment of receivables to Italian companies and institutions. State railways received a loan from the Swiss financial center and used it to strengthen and electrify the railway lines that connected northern Italy to Switzerland.
- About 50% of the Swiss FDI in Italy was concentrated in the north of the country. The importance of Swiss direct investment in Italy was often explained by the influx of Italian capital illegally exported to the confederation, which made Lugano the third financial center of the country.

== Contemporary economic relations ==
Switzerland is one of Italy's most important trading partners. In 2021, Switzerland exported goods worth US$13.2 billion to Italy and imported goods worth US$32.2 billion, resulting in a total trade volume of US$45.4 billion. Investment flows in both directions are of major economic significance for both countries.

In 2020:

- Swiss direct investments in Italy amounted to EUR 28.9 billion
- Italian direct investments in Switzerland totaled EUR 18.4 billion.

Exchanges are close in border regions. Over 70000 Italians cross the border to work in Switzerland. At the end of 2017 there were about a thousand Italian companies in Switzerland, which hire 21,000 employees, mainly in the following sectors: clothing, finance, food and construction. Specifically for the construction sector, the Italian Chamber of Commerce for Switzerland, has launched an initiative called Investment4Business, which facilitates and promotes investments in real estate business between the two countries.

== The "Istituto Svizzero" ==
In 1947 Switzerland founded the “Istituto Svizzero di Roma”, which was created to enhance the cooperation between Italy and Switzerland in the cultural and the scientific fields. This institute participates in various projects like the “settimana della lingua italiana nel mondo” which is an initiative of the Italian foreign ministry. The institute aims to extend the influence of Swiss culture beyond its borders. The structure offers exhibitions, conferences, meetings in Rome, Milan, and Palermo. Every year the institute hosts young researchers or artists. Exchange students attending these programs study Italian, which is one of the four Swiss national languages.

The institute supports Swiss projects and research in Italy. In this way the cooperation and the cultural and scientific exchange between the two countries is enhanced. The main objectives of the structure are:

1. Offer young people the possibility to develop their projects (scientific or artistic) and to participate actively in the Italian activities.
2. Develop artistic and scientific collaborations between Switzerland and Italy.
3. Promote Swiss education, research and innovation in Italy

== Cooperation in education ==
In Milan, Bergamo, Rome, Catania and Como it is possible to find Swiss schools. Two universities, the Università della Svizzera italiana (USI) and the University of Applied Sciences and Arts of Southern Switzerland, offer Italian students the possibility to apply for Swiss Government Excellence Scholarships to the State Secretariat for Education Research and Innovation.

== Diplomatic relations ==
Italy and Switzerland diplomatic relations are based on the conclusion of 22 treaties and on regular meetings between the representatives of the two governments.

== Resident diplomatic missions ==
- Italy has an embassy in Bern and consulates-general in Geneva, Lugano and Zürich and a consulate in Basel.
- Switzerland has an embassy in Rome and a consulate-general in Milan.
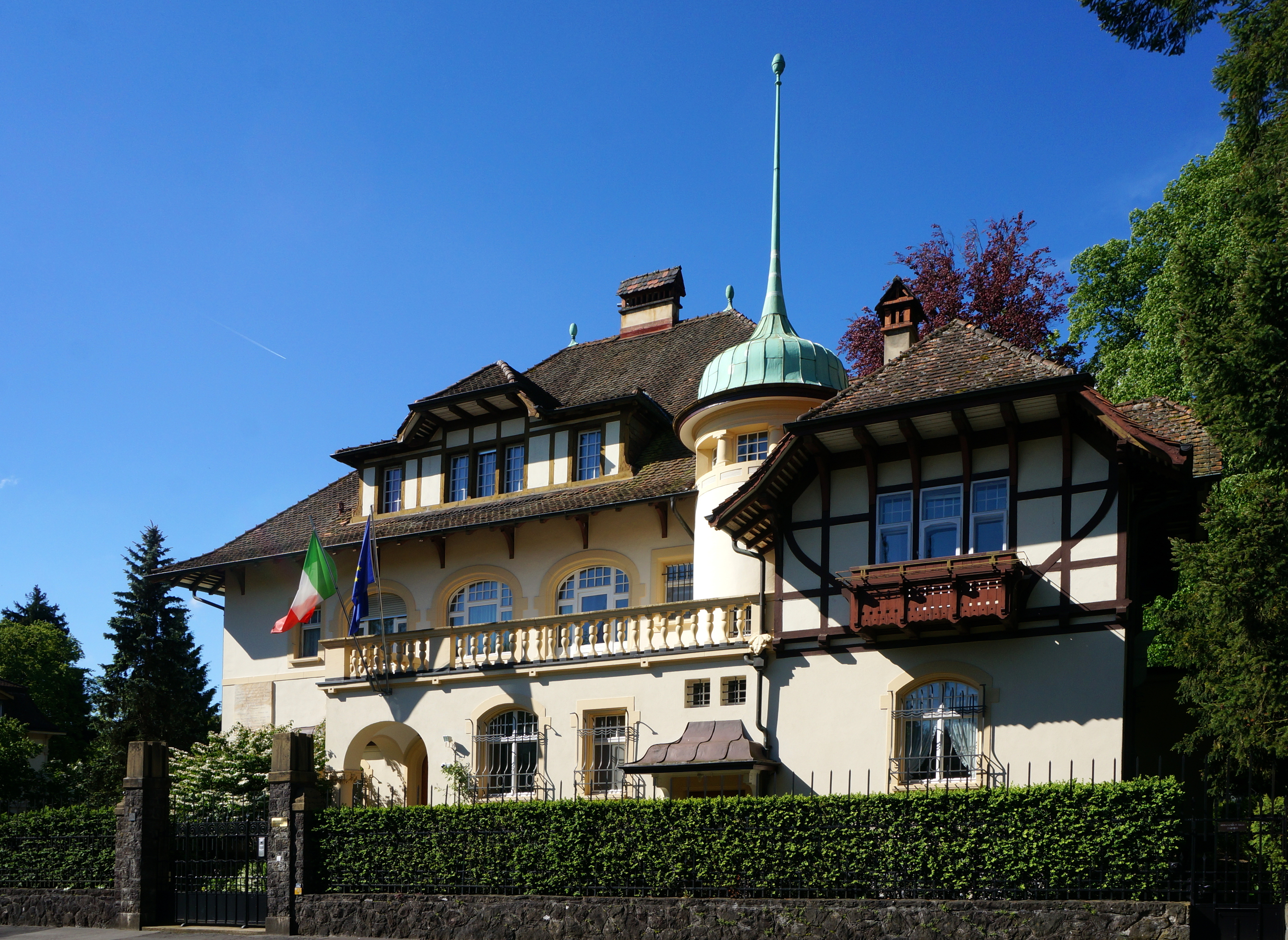
Embassy of Italy in Bern

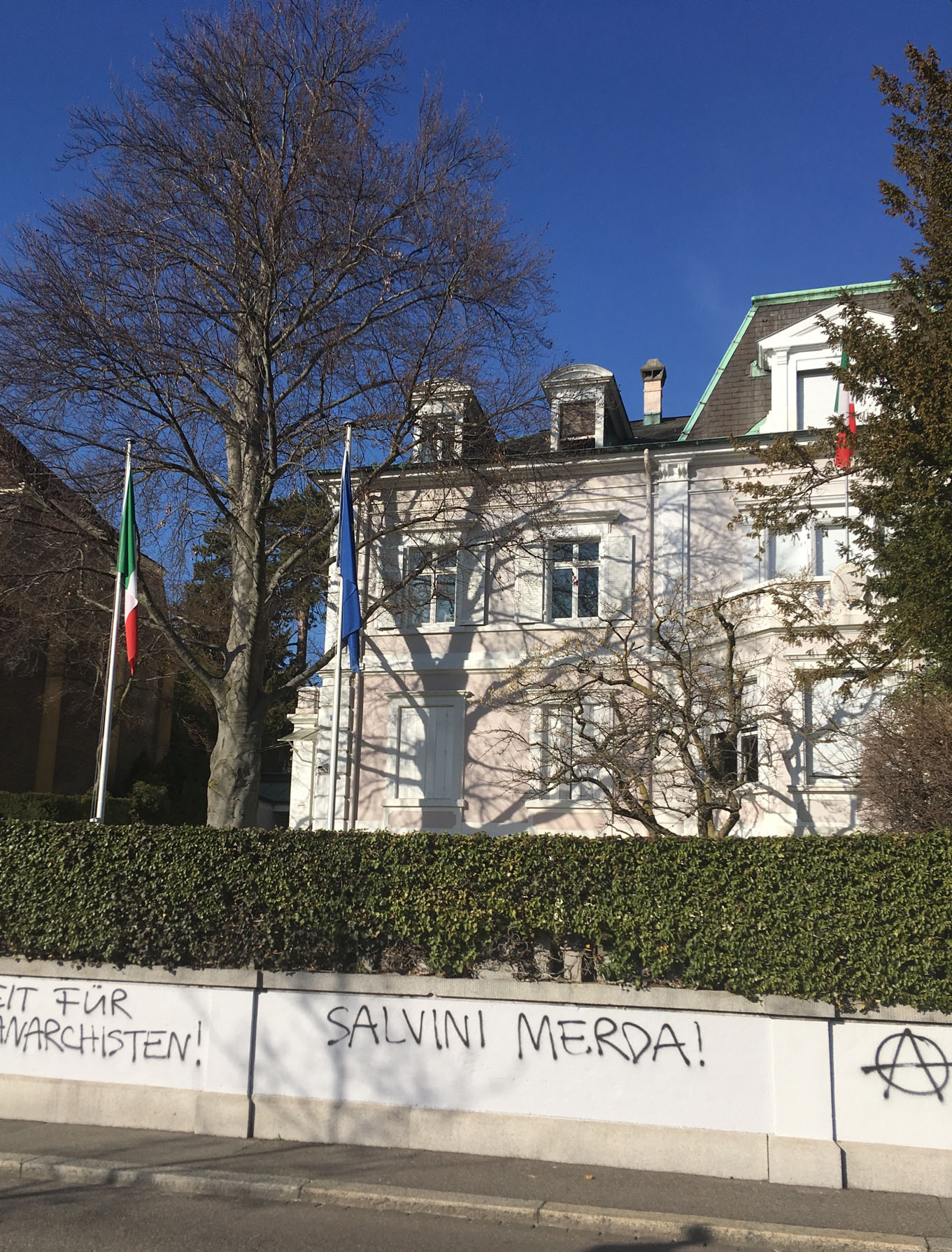
Consulate of Italy in Basel

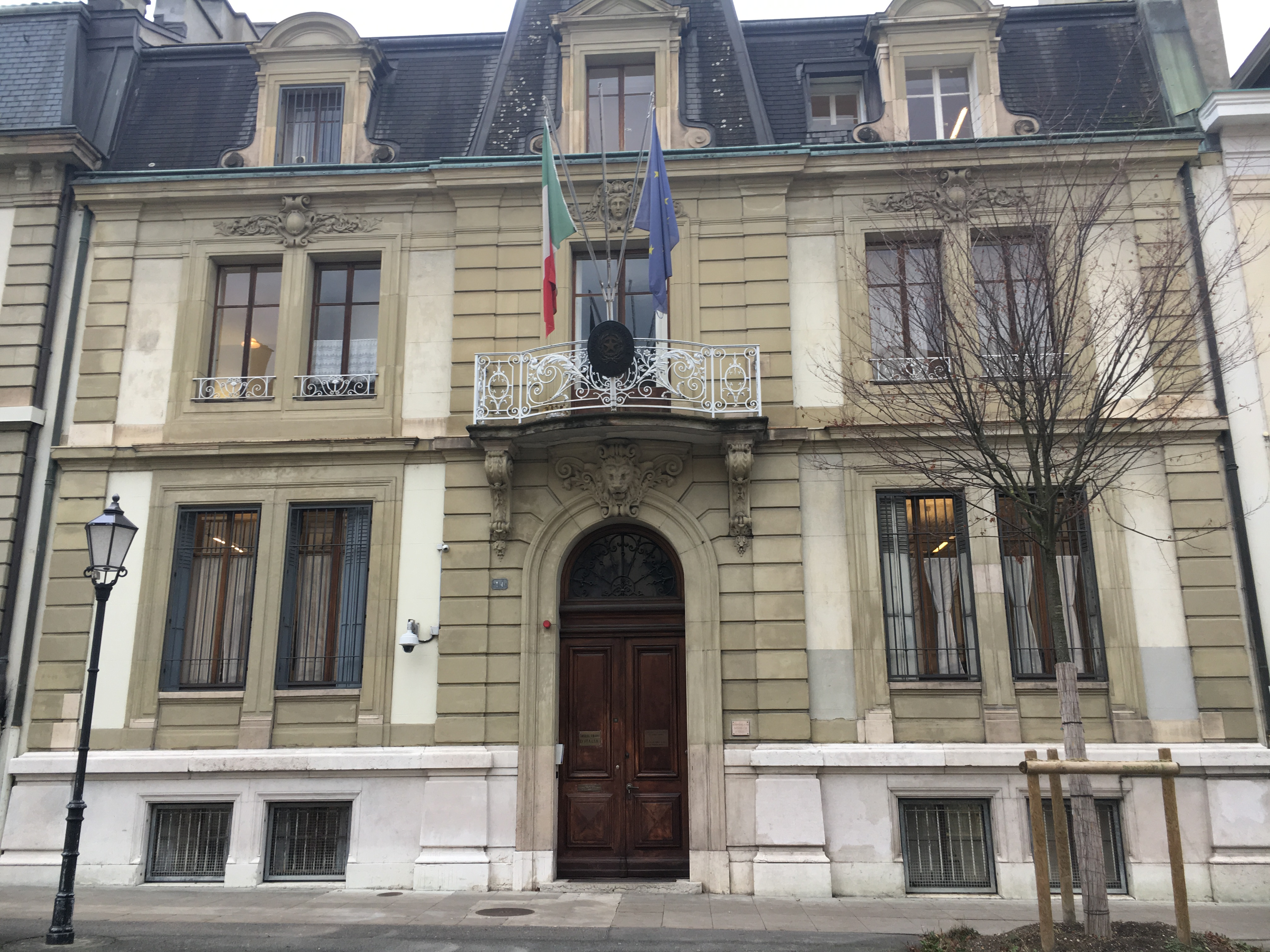
Consulate-General of Italy in Geneva

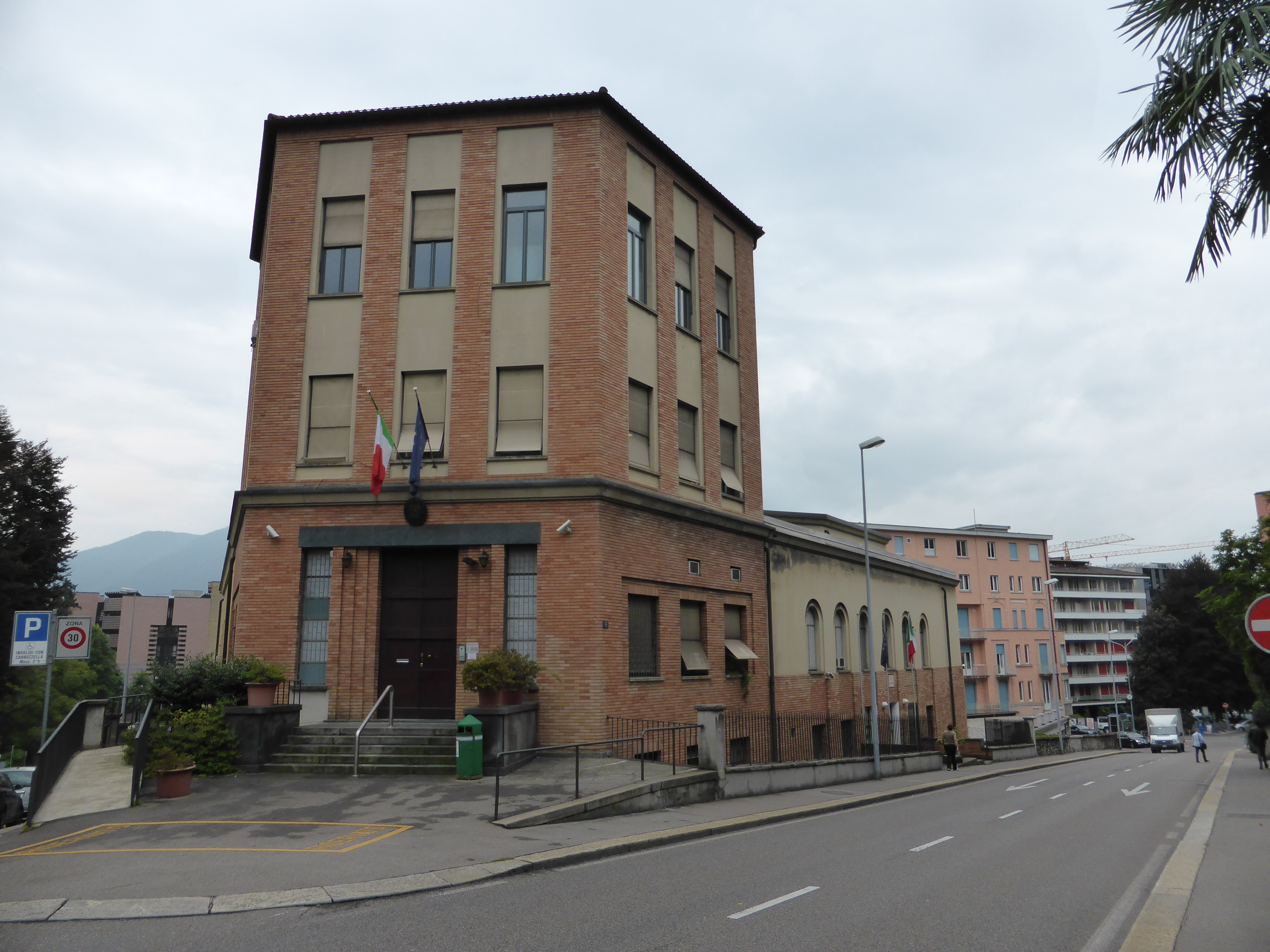
Consulate-General of Italy in Lugano

== See also ==
- Campione d'Italia
- Swiss Italian
- Switzerland–European Union relations
- Swiss in Italy
- Italians in Switzerland
