= Swiss French =

Variety of French spoken in Switzerland

- French of Switzerland
- français de Suisse (French)
- Native to: Romandy, Switzerland
- Native speakers: 2.1 million in Romandy (2020)
- Language family: Indo-European: Italic; Latino-Faliscan; Romance; Italo-Western; Western Romance; Gallo-Romance; Oïl; French; Swiss French
- Early forms: Proto-Indo-European: Proto-Italic; Old Latin; Vulgar Latin; Proto-Romance; Gallo-Romance languages; Old French; Middle French
- Writing system: Latin (French alphabet); French Braille

Language codes
- ISO 639-3: –
- Linguasphere: 51-AAA-if
- IETF: fr-CH
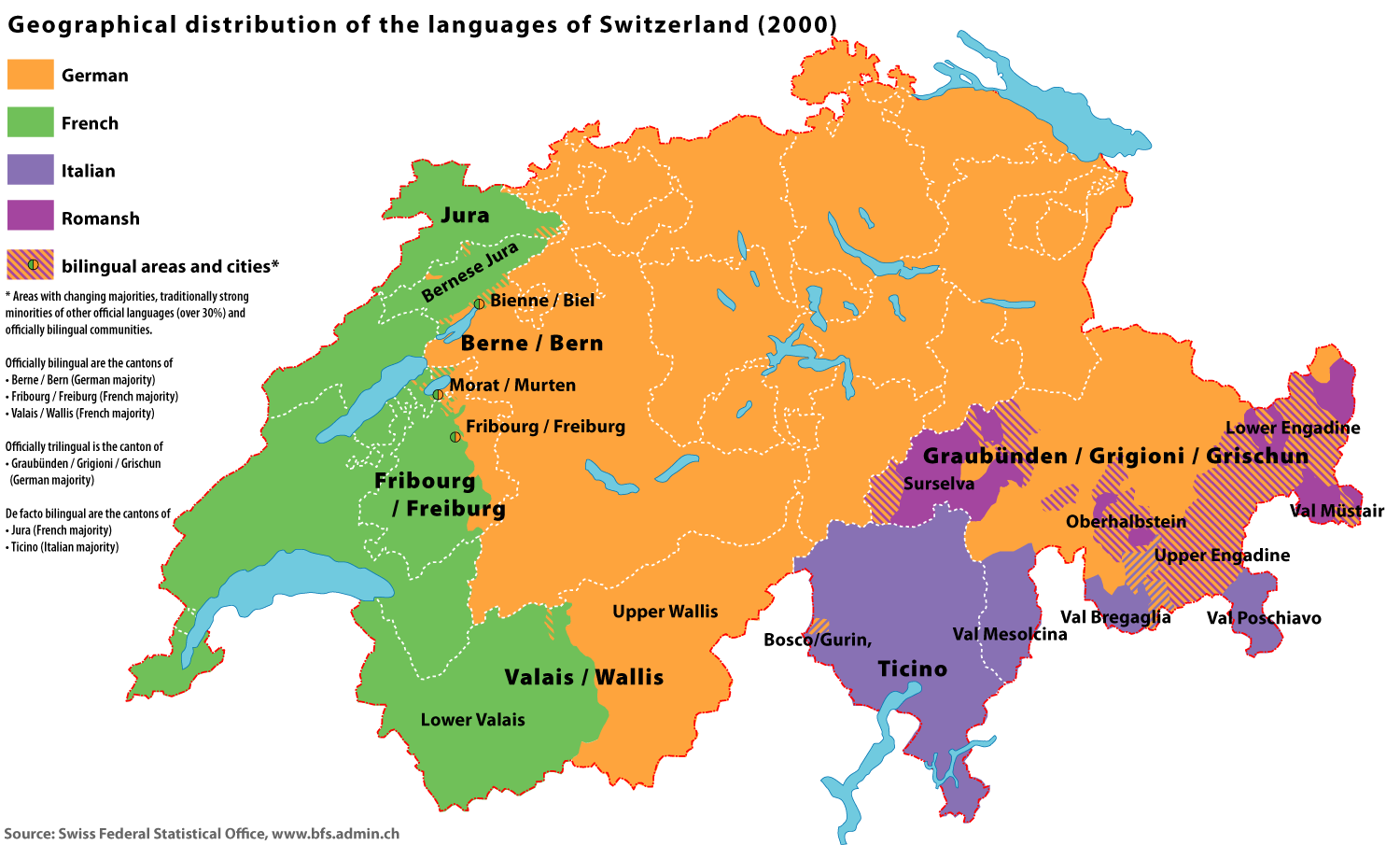
- The French-speaking part of Switzerland is shown in green on this map.

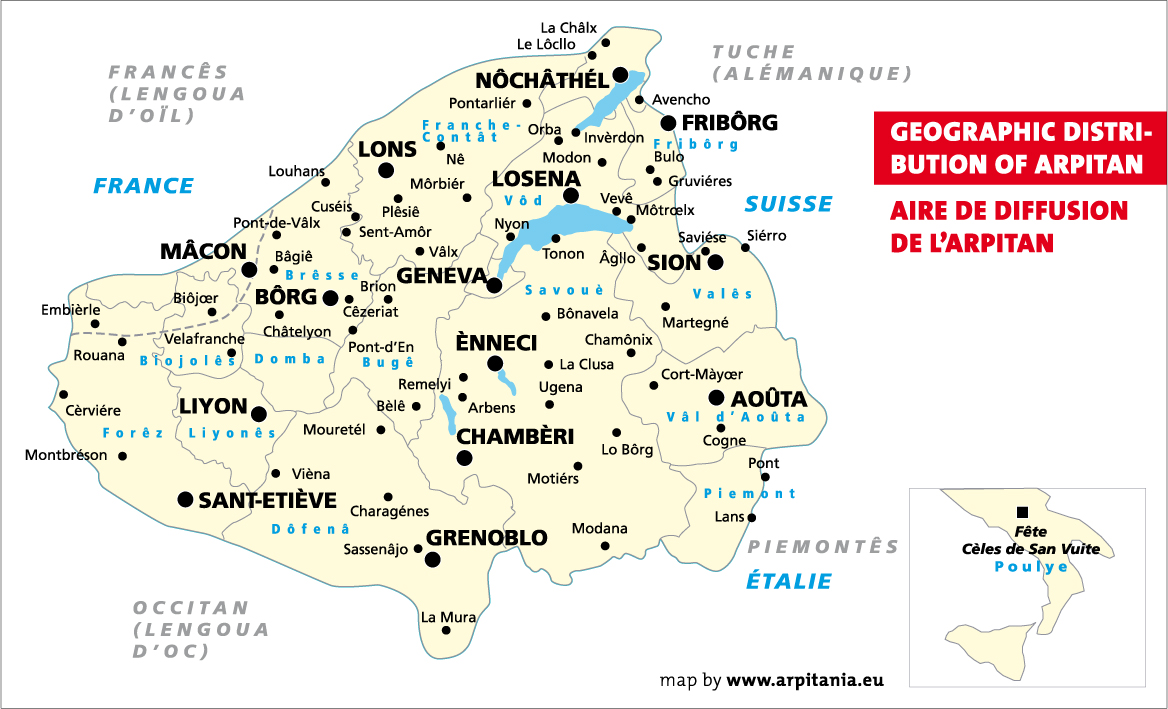
Map of the Franco-Provençal area, historical language spoken in Romandy, with place names in Arpitan and historical political divisions.

Swiss French (French: français de Suisse or suisse romand) is the variety of French spoken in the French-speaking area of Switzerland known as Romandy. French is one of the four official languages of Switzerland, the others being German, Italian, and Romansch. In 2020 around 2 million people, or 22.8% of the population, in Switzerland spoke French as their primary language, and 28% of the population used French most often at work.

Clara, a speaker of Swiss French

The French spoken in Switzerland is very similar to that of France or Belgium. The differences between the French of Switzerland and of France are most noticeably lexical, influenced by local substrate languages. While substantial phonological differences exist, as the French of Switzerland preserves many distinctions lost elsewhere, the phonetic qualities are often quite close, such as with the existence of long vowels or the distinction between /ɛ̃/ and /œ̃/. This contrasts with the differences between Standard German and Swiss German, which are largely mutually unintelligible.

Swiss French is characterized by some terms adopted from Arpitan, which was formerly spoken widely across the alpine communities of Romandy, but has far fewer speakers today. In addition, some expressions have been borrowed from both Swiss and Standard German. Although a standard form of French is taught in schools and used in the government, the media and business, there is no uniform vernacular form of French among the different cantons of Switzerland. For example, some German terms in regions bordering German-speaking communities are completely unused in the area around Geneva, a city by France's border with Switzerland.

== Phonology ==
Oral vowels
	Front				Central	Back	
	unrounded		rounded		Central	Back	
	short	long	short	long	Central	short	long
Close	i	iː	y	yː		u	uː
Close-mid	e	eː	ø	øː	ə	o	
Open-mid	ɛ	ɛː	œ		ə	ɔ	
Open					a		(ɑː)

Nasal vowels
	Front		Back
	unr.	rnd.	Back
Mid			õ
Open	æ̃	œ̃	ɒ̃

- The nasal vowels are pronounced like in France. /ɑ̃/ → [ɒ̃], /ɛ̃/ → [æ̃], /ɔ̃/ → [õ]. Conversely, the nasal vowels /ɛ̃/ and /œ̃/ are kept separate in much Swiss French speech, where much speech in France has merged them. For example, brin (stalk) and brun (brown) are still pronounced differently, like in Quebec and Belgium, unlike in Paris.
- As in Belgium, the distinction between the vowels /ɛ/ and /ɛː/ is maintained in Switzerland, but they have merged in France. For example, mettre (put) and maître (master) are still pronounced differently, unlike in France.
- The distinction between mid vowels /o/ and /ɔ/ has also been maintained in final open syllables, as well as that between /e/ and /ɛ/. For example, peau (skin) and pot (jar) are still pronounced differently, unlike in France and Quebec. For that reason, entré (entered; past participle of the verb entrer) and entrait (third-person singular of entrer in the imperfect indicative) are differentiated, just like in Standard French.
- There is a stronger distinction between long and short vowels in Switzerland:
  - Long vowels are allowed in open syllables, even at the end of a word: ⟨ée⟩, ⟨aie⟩ [eː], ⟨ue⟩ [yː], ⟨ie⟩ [iː], ⟨oue⟩ [uː] and ⟨eue⟩ [øː]. As a result, almost all feminine adjectives are still phonetically distinct from their masculine counterparts, unlike in France and Quebec.
  - Speakers also differentiate masculine from feminine adjectives phonetically, including in final closed syllables, although the spelling only partially bears out this occurrence, e.g. mental is pronounced /mɑ̃.tal/, whilst the feminine mentale is pronounced /mɑ̃.tɑːl/. Other minimal pairs are similarly differentiated, like amen and amène (third-person singular in the present indicative of amener, to lead).
  - The marginal phoneme /ɑ/ is usually pronounced [ɑː], meaning pattes (paws) and pâtes (pasta) are differentiated. Similar to the process described above, the circumflex also affects vowel length when used above a vowel, meaning ⟨î⟩ is pronounced [iː], ⟨ê⟩ as [ɛː], ⟨û⟩ as [yː], ⟨oû⟩ as [uː] and ⟨eû⟩ [øː].

== Examples of words that differ between Switzerland and France ==
Swiss French	Metropolitan French	English	Notes
action	promotion	special offer	Germanism, from "Aktion" ("promotional campaign").
adieu	salut	hello/goodbye	In French, "adieu" means "farewell" and is generally never used except in cases where the people concerned will not meet again. In Switzerland it is used as an informal general form of greeting when people meet or leave each other.
attique	dernier étage	top floor (attic)	
bancomat	Distributeur automatique de billets	ATM	Germanism(?), from Bankomat (Bankautomat)
benzine	essence	petrol	Germanism, from Benzin
bobet	crétin (noun) or bête/stupide (adjective)	idiot (noun) or stupid (adjective)	
boguet	mobylette	moped	
bonnard	sympa or bien	nice	Informal term.
bonne-main	pourboire	tip (gratuity)	Literally "good-hand".
borne hydrante	bouche d'incendie	fire hydrant	
bourbine	suisse-allemand	Swiss-German	This word is considered pejorative.
carnotzet	cave à vin/cellier/fumoir	Wine cellar	This expression can sometimes be found in France, in places close to Switzerland.
chenis	désordre	mess	
chiquelette	chewing-gum	chewing-gum	
collège (Genève, Valais, Fribourg) or gymnase (Vaud)	lycée	high school	
crousille	tirelire	piggy bank	
cornet	sac en plastique	plastic bag	In France, "cornet" would typically designate an ice cream cone.
cutips	coton-tige	cotton bud/swab	Antonomasia from the brand Q-tips which phonetically becomes "cutips" when pronounced in French.
cycle (Genève, Fribourg, Valais)	collège	middle school	
déjeuner	petit-déjeuner	breakfast	Meal names have shifted in the French of France, where déjeuner is now the name for lunch, and dîner now refers to dinner. Swiss French (like those of Belgium and Québec) has retained the older meanings.
dîner	déjeuner	lunch	Meal names have shifted in the French of France, where déjeuner is now the name for lunch, and dîner now refers to dinner. Swiss French (like those of Belgium and Québec) has retained the older meanings.
duvet	couette	comforter / duvet	"Duvet" comes from the fact that comforters used to be filled with down feather (duvet). "Duvet" in France means sleeping bag, for similar reasons.
s'encoubler	se prendre les pieds dans quelque chose/trébucher	to trip over	
s'énuquer	se briser la nuque	to break one's own neck	
étude d'avocats	cabinet d'avocats	law firm	
fœhn	sèche-cheveux	hairdryer	Germanism, from der Föhn (the hairdryer); both names ultimately derive from the Foehn wind.
fonds	terrain or champs	field	
fourre	dossier/housse	folder	In French, "fourrer" means "to stuff".
Frouze / frouze	Français / français	people from France / French	This word is considered pejorative. Used also in Belgium.
galetas	grenier	attic	Also used in Alpine regions of France, down to Dauphiné.
giratoire	rond-point, giratoire	roundabout	Comes from "carrefour à sens giratoire" which would translate to "circular crossroads".
gouille	flaque	puddle	
huitante	quatre-vingts	eighty	In Swiss French, as opposed to the French of France, the words for seventy, eighty and ninety are similar in construction to the ones used for thirty up to sixty. Huitante is only heard in Vaud, Valais and Fribourg.
linge	serviette	towel	Swiss French still uses the generic uncountable word “le linge” to define “laundry”, but the countable word “un/le/les linge-s” (which has no meaning in the French of France) means “une/la/les serviette-s”. Furthermore, the use of “serviette” is exclusively for “napkin” in Swiss French, whereas in regular French it could mean both “towel” or “napkin”.
lolette	tétine	pacifier/teat	
maman de jour	assistante maternelle	day care assistant	
mascogner	tricher aux examens	cheat during exams	
maturité	baccalauréat	high-school final examination	From German "Maturitätsexamen", "Matura".
mutr	mère	mother	Comes from the German word for "Mother", "Mutter".
natel	(téléphone) portable	mobile phone	
nom de bleu !	nom de dieu !	in the name of god!/god dammit!	
nonante	quatre-vingt-dix	ninety	In Swiss French, as opposed to the French of France, the words for seventy, eighty and ninety are similar in construction to the ones used for thirty up to sixty.
panosse	serpillière	floorcloth or mop	
papier ménage	papier essuie-tout	paper towel	
pive	pomme de pin	conifer cone	
poutzer	nettoyer	to clean	Comes from the German verb "putzen" which means "to clean".
Procès verbal d'examen (PV)	bulletin de note	report card	
réclame	publicité	advertisement	"Réclame" is an older disused word for advertising in French.
régie	agence immobilière	real estate agency	
roye	pluie	rain	
royer	pleuvoir	to rain	
sans autre	sans plus attendre	without delay	
santé	à tes/vos souhaits	bless you (when someone sneezes)	In France, santé, in particular by itself, as an exclamation (Santé !), is always interpreted as a drinking toast (À votre/ta santé !, meaning "[here's] to your health").
septante	soixante-dix	seventy	In Swiss French, as opposed to the French of France, words for seventy, eighty and ninety are similar in construction to the ones used for thirty up to sixty.
service	je t'en/vous en prie	you're welcome	From "à votre service" meaning "at your service".
services	couverts	cutlery	
signofile/indicateur	clignotant	indicator/turn signal (motor vehicle)	
souper	dîner	dinner	Meal names have shifted in the French of France, where souper has been replaced by dîner (which historically referred to lunch). Swiss French (like those of Belgium and Québec) has retained the older meanings.
tablard	étagère	shelf	
uni (short for université)	fac (short word for faculté)	university	
votation	scrutin	voting	
vatr	père	father	Comes from the German word for "Father", "Vater".

== See also ==
- Demographics of Switzerland
- Linguistic geography of Switzerland
- Swiss Standard German
- Swiss German
- Swiss Italian
