= Edoardo Winspeare =

Italian actor, screenwriter, and film director

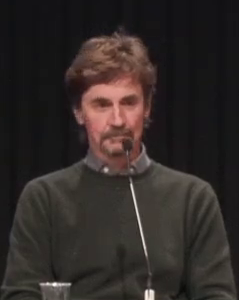
- Born: 14 September 1965 (age 60); Klagenfurt, Austria
- Occupations: Actor, film director
- Years active: 1996–present

Edoardo Carlo Winspeare Guicciardi (born 14 September 1965) is an Italian actor, screenwriter and film director. He has directed seven films since 1996. His first feature film, Pizzicata, was presented at festivals such as Berlin, San Francisco, and San Sebastian (where it won a special mention).

He is a member of a noble family, migrated in then Kingdom of Naples from England, with a baronial title.

His mother was Princess Elisabeth of Liechtenstein, Baroness Winspeare (by marriage), descendant of Prince Eduard Franz of Liechtenstein and sister of Prince Alexander of Liechtenstein (1929–2012).

== Filmography ==
=== Director ===
- Pizzicata (1996)
- Life Blood (2000)
- The Miracle (2003)
- The Brave Men (2008)
- Quiet Bliss (2014)
- La vita in comune (2017)
- Didi (2025)

=== Actor ===
- Bell'epoker, directed by Nico Cirasola (2003)
- We Believed , directed by Mario Martone (2010)
