= Azzurro (film) =

- Directed by: Denis Rabaglia
- Written by: Denis Rabaglia; Luca de Benedittis; Antoine Jaccoud
- Starring: Paolo Villaggio; Francesca Pipoli
- Cinematography: Dominique Grosz
- Music by: Louis Crelier
- Release date: 12 August 2000 (LFF)
- Running time: 84 minutes
- Countries: Switzerland; France / Italy
- Languages: French; Italian

Azzurro is a 2000 French-Italian-Swiss drama film directed by Denis Rabaglia.

== Plot ==
Azzurro tells the story of a grandfather, Giuseppe, who returns to the Salento region after years of working in Switzerland. There, he finds his granddaughter, Carla, who suffers from a serious eye condition. Following a heart attack, Giuseppe becomes increasingly determined to secure treatment for her, eventually returning to Switzerland to seek help from his former employer. In the process, he is forced to confront unresolved issues from his own deeply guarded past.

== Cast ==
- Paolo Villaggio as Giuseppe De Metrio
- Francesca Pipoli as Carla De Metrio
- Marie-Christine Barrault as Elizabeth Broyer
- Jean-Luc Bideau as Gaston Broyer
- Renato Scarpa as Giorgio
- Julien Boisselier as Pascal Broyer
- Antonio Petrocelli as Roberto De Metrio
- Soraya Gomaa as Lucia De Metrio
- Tom Novembre as Philippe
- Anna Ferruzzo as Nurse
