= Italian Grisons =

Italian and Lombard-speaking parts of Grisons, Switzerland

Coordinates: 46.3434°N 9.590624°E

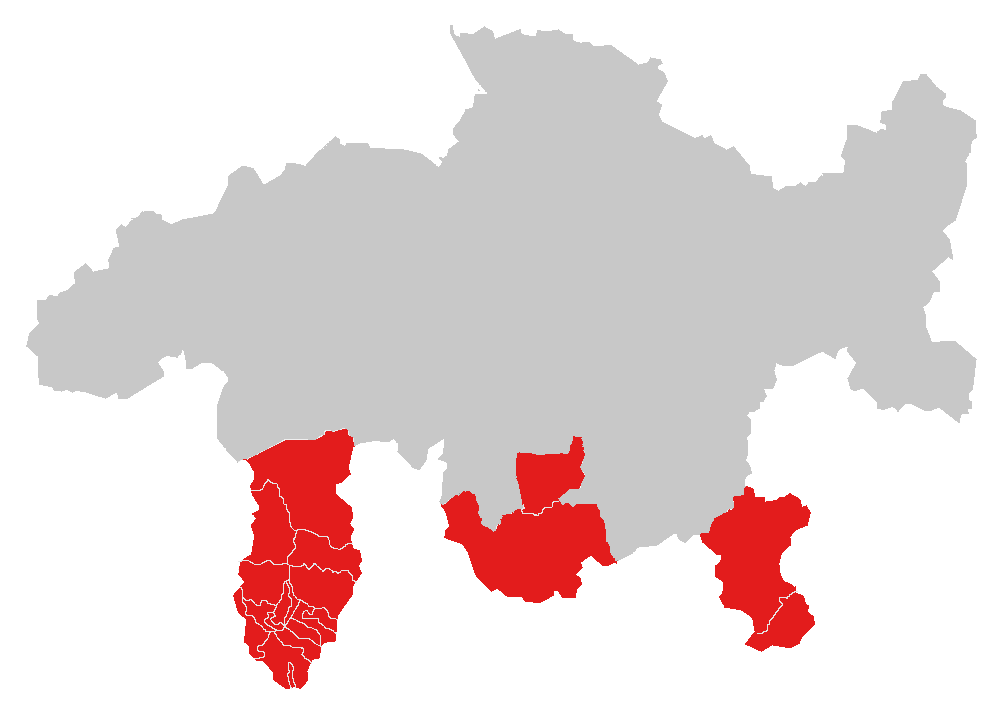
The canton of Grisons with the Italian-speaking municipalities highlighted. The village of Bivio, in which Italian was formerly the dominant language, is highlighted as well.

Italian Grisons or Italian Grigioni (Italian: Grigionitaliano or Grigioni italiano; German: Italienischbünden; Romansh: Grischun talian; French: Grisons italiens) or sometimes also called Lombard Grisons (Lombard: Grison lombard, lumbard; Romansh: Grischun lumbard), is the region of the Canton of Grisons, Switzerland, in which Italian is the dominant language.

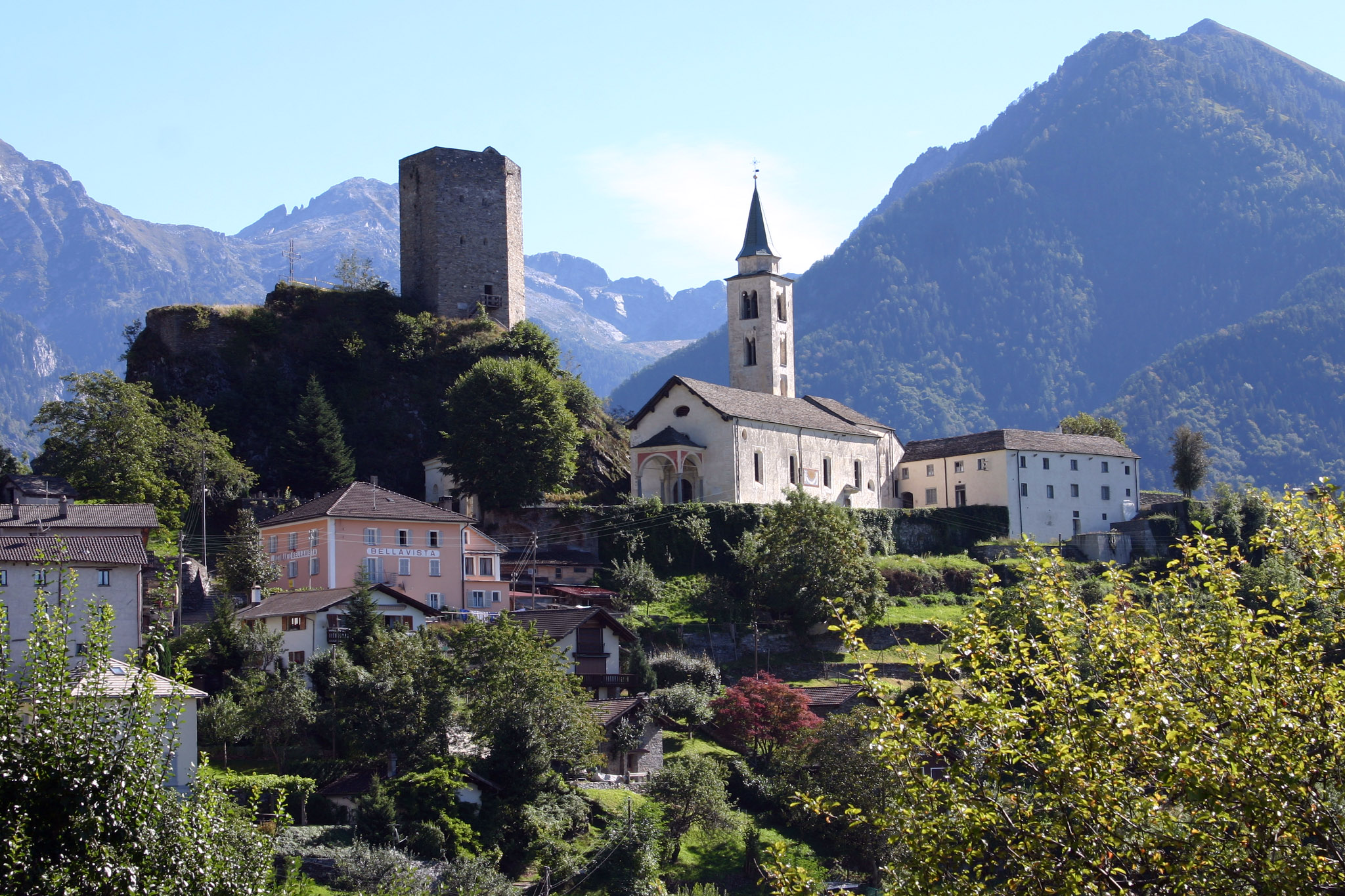
Village of Santa Maria in Calanca in the Moesa Region

Located in the southernmost part of the canton, it comprises (from west to east) of the region of Moesa, the municipality of Bregaglia in the Region of Maloja and the region of Bernina. It has a population of about 15,000, of which more than 85% speak standard Italian or Lombard. The village and former municipality in Bivio in the district of Albula, located to the north of Bregaglia, once had an Italian-speaking plurality as well. Between 1980 and 1990, however, it was overtaken by German, which is now the majority language of the village.

== Geography ==
The three regions that make up the Italian Grisons are separated by mountains, isolated from the rest of the canton as well as from each other, and from Italy. Because of their remoteness and the lack of economic possibilities, emigration has traditionally been a serious issue, and even today more than half of the people born in the Italian Grisons live and work outside of the region in the predominantly Italian-speaking canton of Ticino.

== Religion ==
Moesa and Bernina are predominantly Roman Catholic, while Bregaglia is chiefly Protestant. Bregaglia is the only municipality in Switzerland with an Italian-speaking Protestant majority.

== Education ==
The dominance of the Italian language in the canton has diminished in recent years, especially to the east in the two regions furthest from Ticino. This is believed to result from migration of German speakers into traditionally Italian-speaking areas, the spread of German language mass media and the absence of secondary schools teaching in Italian in Grisons. The situation is similar to that of Romansh in the canton.

Pro Grigioni Italiano, an organization created in 1918 to promote the Italian language and culture in Grisons, is officially recognized by the cantonal government as representing the indigenous Italian-speaking minority of the canton.

== See also ==
- Bernese Jura
