= German-speaking Switzerland =

Part of Switzerland

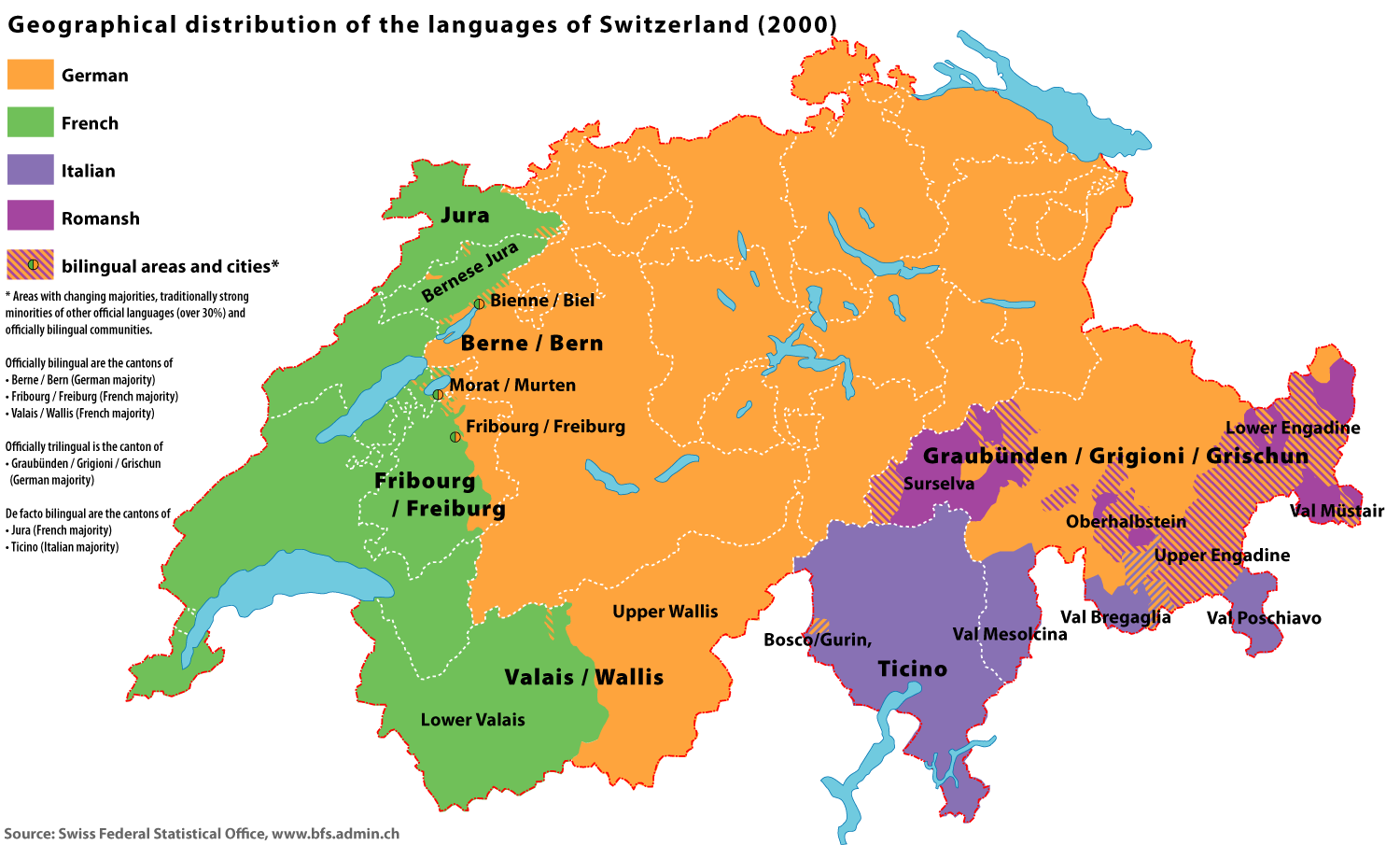
The German-speaking part of Switzerland is shown in orange on this map of Languages of Switzerland.

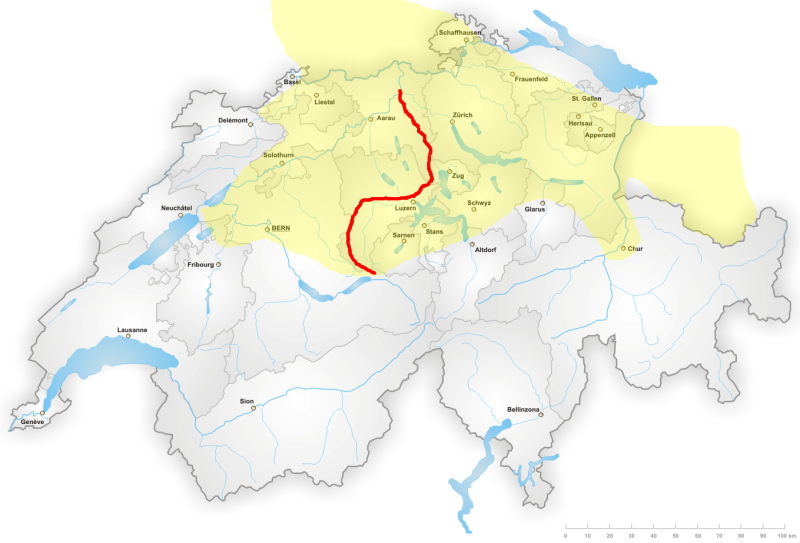
Distribution of High Alemannic dialects; marked in red is the Brünig-Napf-Reuss line.

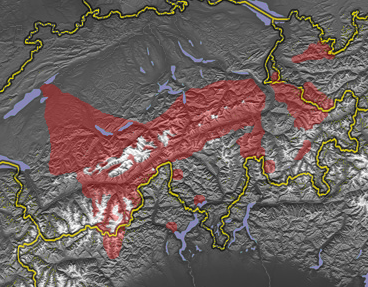
Distribution of Highest Alemannic dialects

The German-speaking part of Switzerland (German: Deutschschweiz [ˈdɔʏtʃ.ʃvaɪts]; French: Suisse alémanique; Italian: Svizzera tedesca; Romansh: Svizra tudestga) comprises about 65 percent of Switzerland (North Western Switzerland, Eastern Switzerland, Central Switzerland, most of the Swiss Plateau and the greater part of the Swiss Alps).

The variety of the German language spoken in Switzerland is called Swiss German which refers to any of the Alemannic dialects and which are divided into Low, High and Highest Alemannic. The only exception within German-speaking Switzerland is the municipality of Samnaun where an Austro-Bavarian dialect is spoken.

German is the sole official language in 17 Swiss cantons (Aargau, Appenzell Ausserrhoden, Appenzell Innerrhoden, Basel-Stadt, Basel-Landschaft, Glarus, Lucerne, Nidwalden, Obwalden, Schaffhausen, Schwyz, Solothurn, St. Gallen, Thurgau, Uri, Zug, and Zurich). French and German are co-official in 3 cantons (Bern, Fribourg, and Valais). In the trilingual canton of Graubünden, more than half the population speaks German, while most of the rest speak one of the other official languages, Romansh and Italian.

By the Middle Ages, a marked difference had developed between the rural cantons of the German-speaking part of Switzerland and the city cantons, divided by views about trade and commerce. After the Reformation, all cantons were either Catholic or Protestant, and the denominational influences on culture added to the differences. Even today, where all cantons are somewhat denominationally mixed, the different historical denominations can be seen in the mountain villages, where Roman Catholic Central Switzerland abounds with chapels and statues of saints, and the farm houses in the very similar landscape of the Protestant Bernese Oberland show Bible verses carved on the housefronts, instead.

== Relations with French-speaking Switzerland ==
In German-Swiss, the French-speaking part of Switzerland (Romandy) may be colloquially referred to as Welschland, which has the same etymology as the English Welsh (see Walha) or the French Welche used by Alsatians. In Germany Welsch and Welschland refer to Italy; there, the term is antiquated, rarely used, and somewhat disparaging.

== See also ==
- German-speaking Europe
- Languages of Switzerland
- Swiss German
- Swiss Standard German
