= Röstigraben =

Cultural boundary between German- and French-speaking Swiss

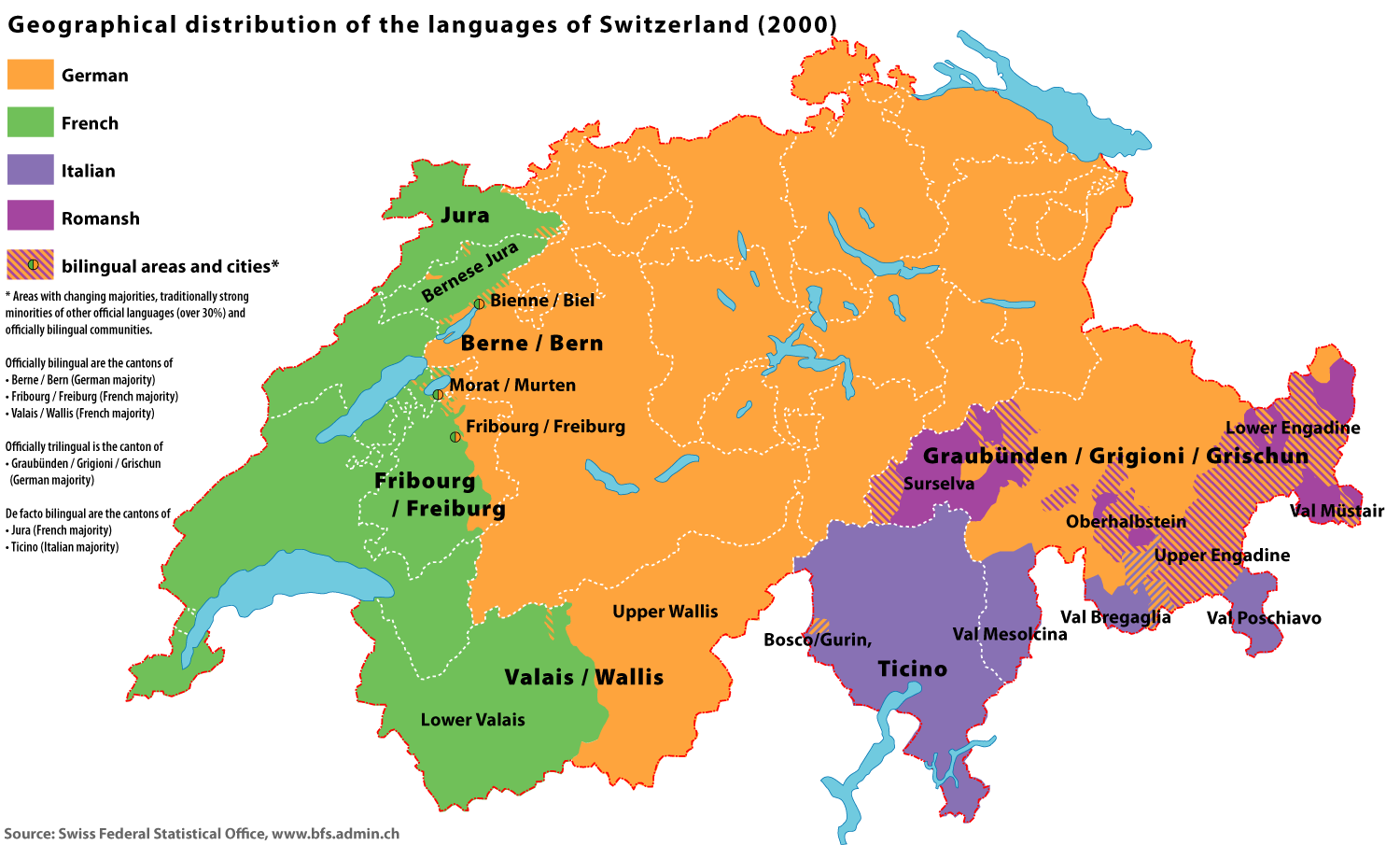
French (green) and German (orange) language areas of Switzerland

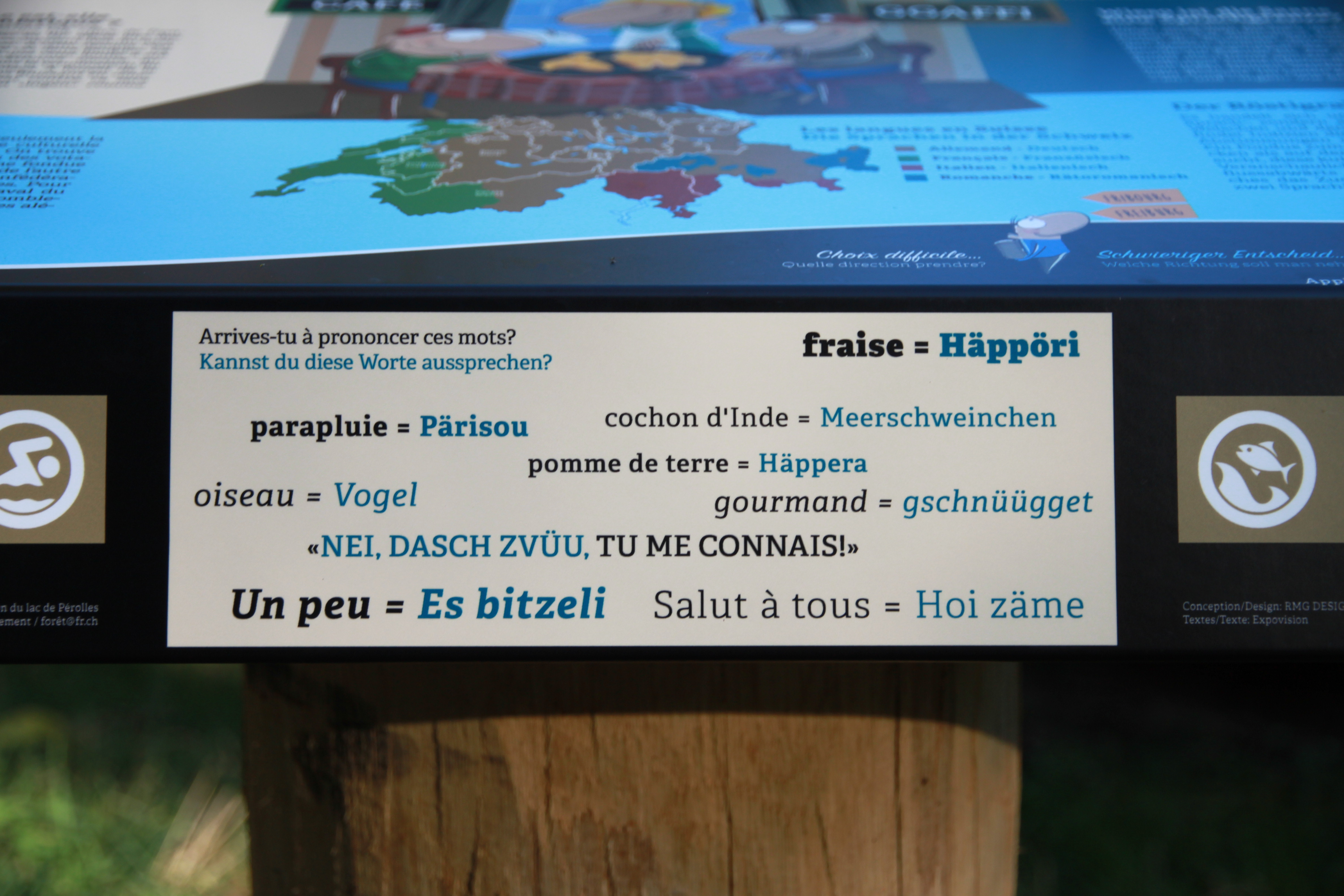
French and Local Germanic dialect in the contact zone at the so-called "Röstigraben"

The Röstigraben (German pronunciation: [ˈrøːstiˌɡraːbən]; lit. 'Rösti ditch' or 'Rösti trench', also transcribed Röschtigraben to reflect the Swiss German pronunciation [ˈrøːʃtiˌɡrabə]) is the cultural boundary between German-speaking Switzerland and Romandy, the French-speaking parts. There is also the term Polentagraben, referring to the boundary between German-speaking cantons and the Italian-speaking canton of Ticino.

The term first appeared during World War I, when neutral Switzerland stood between the warring German Empire and the French Republic.

== Etymology ==
The first part of the term is derived from the Swiss German name for hashed potatoes, rösti, which originated in the canton of Bern and is considered typical of Swiss German cuisine.

Graben has both the concrete and abstract meaning of "rift", with the Saane/Sarine river valley in the bilingual canton of Fribourg separating the linguistic areas. The Swiss-French use a similar expression: barrière de rös(ch)ti, literally "rösti barrier", or rideau de rös(ch)ti "rösti curtain" (reminiscent of the Iron Curtain). Just like Röstigraben it has become a familiar facetious expression used whenever differences arise, e.g. different voting results.

== Definition ==
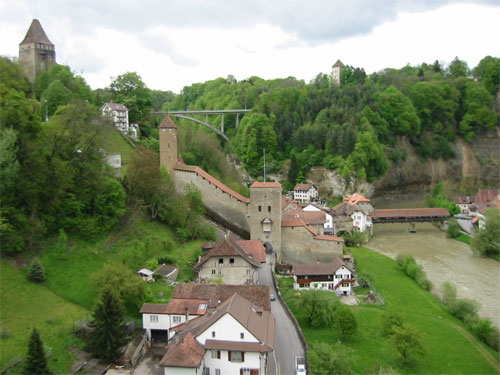
The Sarine in Fribourg

Geographically the line stretches from the Jura Mountains (canton of Jura and Bernese Jura) in the north along Lake Biel, Lake Neuchâtel and Lake Morat through the Swiss Plateau, then crosses the Swiss Alps and the valley of Rhône, separating Lower and Upper Valais, and finally reaches the Italian border between the municipalities of Evolène and Zermatt. Folklorists emphasize the importance of the parallel Brünig-Napf-Reuss line further in the east, separating the historic Alemannic (East) and Burgundian (West) spheres of influence.

By analogy, the term Polentagraben is used to refer to cultural and political differences between Italian-speaking Ticino and German-speaking Switzerland. The canton of Ticino is seen as having a tougher stance towards migrant workers and a greater attachment to the notion of Swissness.

== Political Significance ==
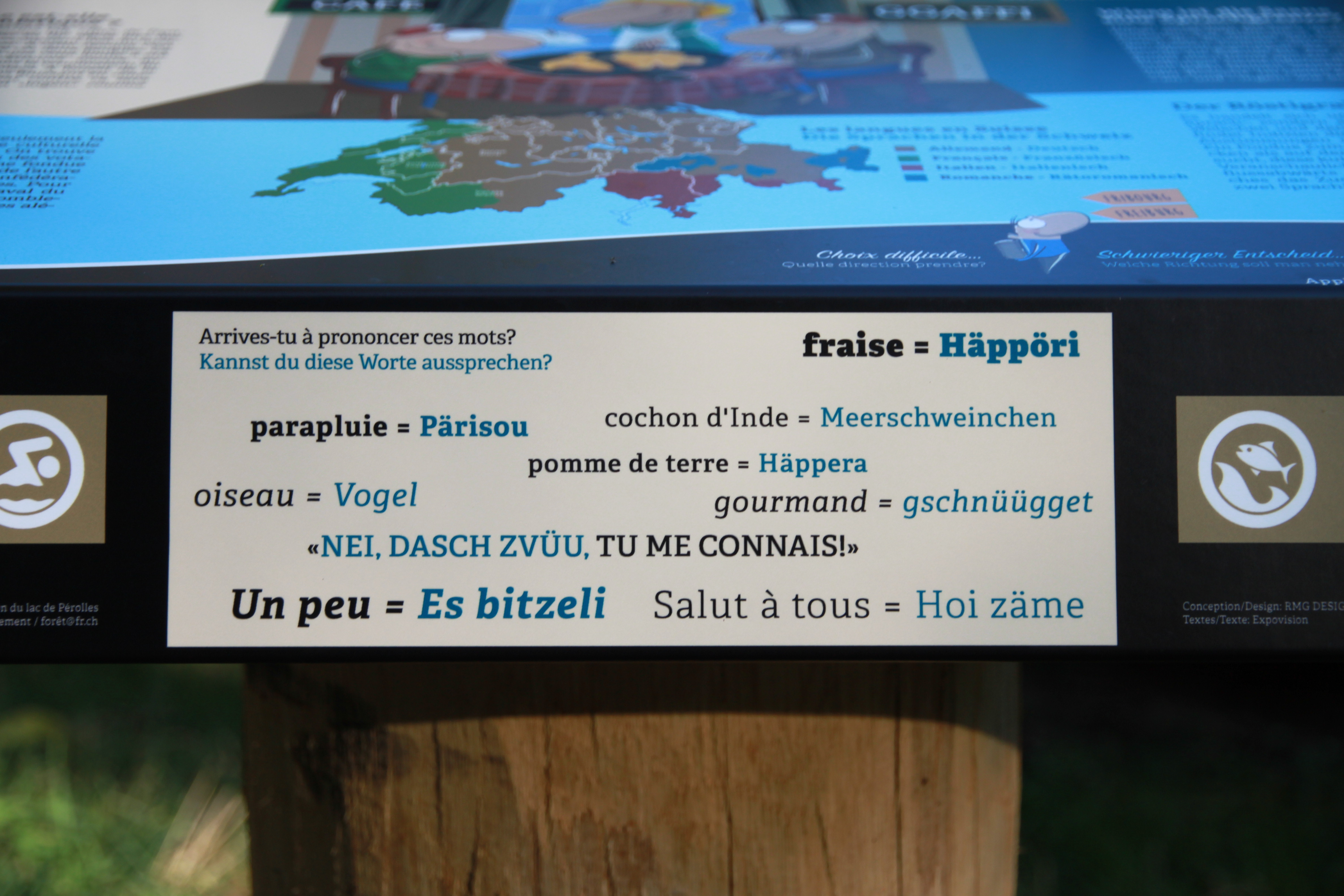
French and Sensler German in the contact zone of the Röstigraben

=== Differences in Voting Behavior ===
This term is frequently used when voting patterns in referendums differ based on linguistic regions:

- These differences are most pronounced in the realms of foreign and social policy, yet they are less perceptible regarding policies concerning transportation, the environment, narcotics, and social issues.
- On foreign policy matters, Italian-speaking Switzerland typically aligns with German-speaking Switzerland, whereas on other issues, it tends to align with French-speaking Switzerland; conversely, northwestern Switzerland often votes similarly to French-speaking Switzerland and cannot be clearly categorized within the German-speaking side of the "Röstigraben."

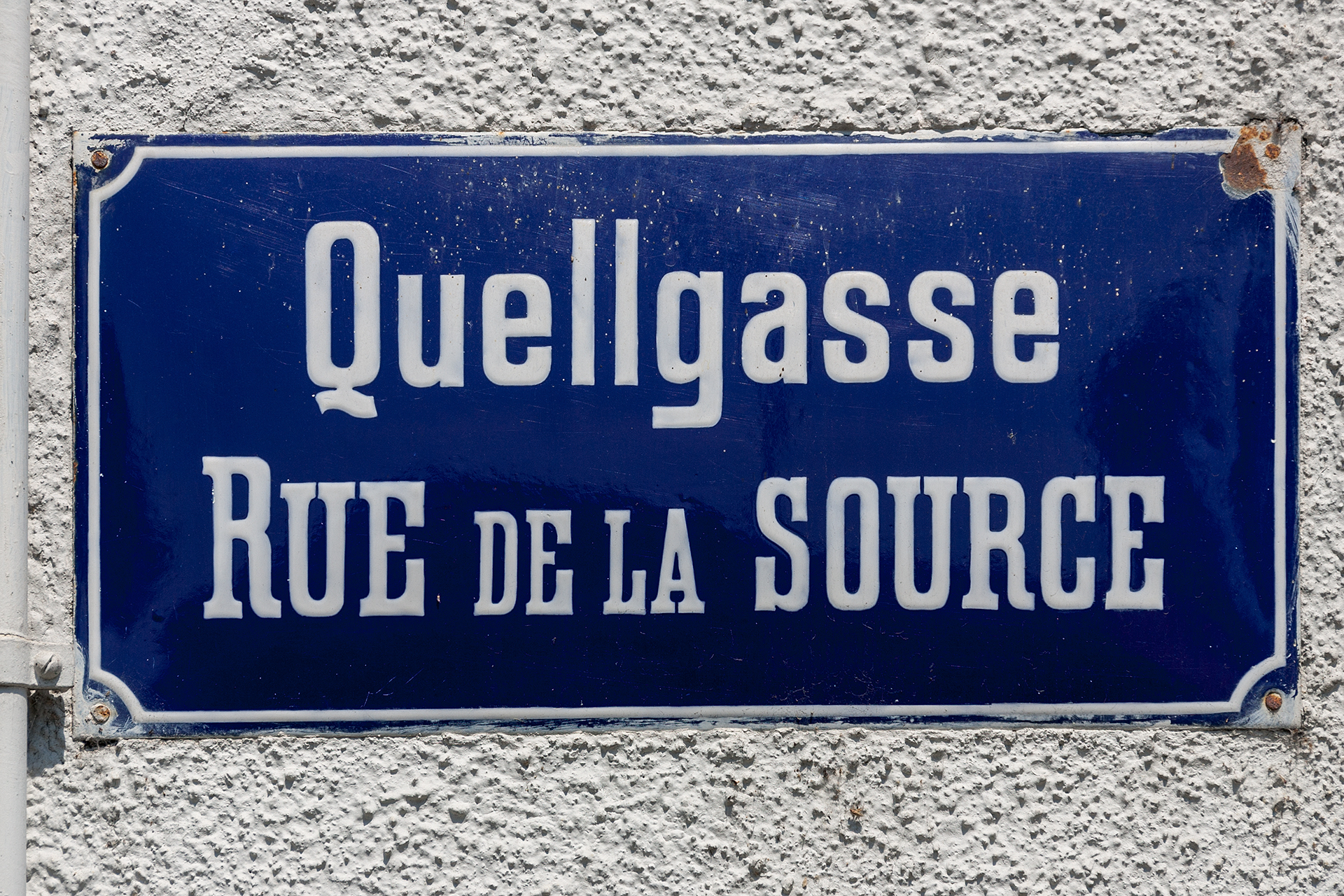
Bilingual street sign in Biel/Bienne

=== Developments in the 21st Century ===
Since the 2010s, the significance of the "Röstigraben" in voting results has gradually diminished. It has been superseded by the urban-rural divide. In other words, voting outcomes in cities and rural municipalities are increasingly diverging from one another.

== See also ==
- Languages of Switzerland
- Culture of Switzerland
- Weißwurstäquator, which, similar to the Röstigraben, represents the Bavarian-German Kulturgrenze (Culture Border).
- Barassi Line
