= Romandy =

French-speaking part of Switzerland

Coordinates: 46.2000°N 6.1500°E

Romandy: Romandie (French); Romandia (Arpitan); Welschland (German); Romandia (Italian); Romanda (Romansh)
- Cultural region of Switzerland
- Language distribution in Switzerland by the year 2000. Romandy is shown in green.
- Country: Switzerland
- Entire Cantons: Geneva; Jura; Neuchâtel; Vaud
- Parts of Cantons: Bernese Jura (Berne); Western Fribourg (Fribourg); Lower Valais (Valais)
- Largest city: Geneva

Area
  - Total: 8,284 km^{2} (3,198 sq mi)

Population (2019)
  - Total: 1,951,187
  - Density: 235/km^{2} (610/sq mi)

Demographics
  - Languages: French (Swiss French) Arpitan

Romandy (Note: French: Romandie or Suisse romande; Arpitan: Romandia or Suisse romanda. Before World War I, the term 'French Switzerland' (French: Suisse française) was also used. German: Romandie [ʁomɑ̃ˈdiː] or Welschland, Italian: Romandia, Romansh: Romanda.) is the French-speaking historical and cultural region of Switzerland. In 2020, about 2 million people, or 22.8% of the Swiss population, lived in Romandy. The majority of the romand population lives in the western part of the country, especially the Arc Lémanique region along Lake Geneva, connecting Geneva, Vaud, and the Lower Valais.

French is the sole official language in four Swiss cantons: Geneva, Vaud, Neuchâtel, and Jura. Additionally, French and German have co-official status in three cantons: Fribourg/Freiburg, Valais/Wallis, and Berne/Bern.

== Name ==
The adjective romand (feminine romande) is a regional dialectal variant of roman (modern French romain, i.e. "Roman"), which in Old French was used as a term for the Gallo-Romance vernaculars. Use of the adjective romand (with its unetymological final -d) in reference to the Franco-Provençal dialects can be traced to the 15th century; it is recorded, as rommant, in a document written in Fribourg in 1424 and becomes current in the 17th and 18th centuries in Vaud and Fribourg; it was adopted in Geneva in the 19th century, but its usage never spread outside of what is now French-speaking Switzerland.

The term Suisse romande has become widely used since World War I; before World War I and during the 19th century, the term Suisse française "French Switzerland" was used, reflecting the cultural and political prestige of France (the canton of Vaud having been created by Napoleon out of former Bernese subject territories, while Geneva, Valais and Jura were even briefly joined to France, as the Léman, Simplon and Mont-Terrible departments, respectively). Suisse romande is used in contrast to Suisse alémanique ("Alemannic Switzerland"), the term for Alemannic German speaking Switzerland. Formed by analogy is Suisse italienne ("Italian Switzerland"), which is composed of Ticino and of a part of Grisons.

In Swiss German, French-speaking Switzerland is known as Welschland or Welschschweiz, and the French-speaking Swiss as Welsche, using the old Germanic term for non-Germanic speakers still existing in English as Welsh (see *Walhaz). The terms Welschland and Welschschweiz are also used in written Swiss Standard German but in more formal contexts they are sometimes exchanged for französischsprachige Schweiz ("French-speaking Switzerland") or französische Schweiz ("French Switzerland"). Simple Westschweiz "western Switzerland" may also be used as a loose synonym.

== Politics ==
"Romandy" is not an official territorial division of Switzerland any more than there is a clear linguistic boundary. For instance, substantial parts of the canton of Fribourg and the western canton of Bern are traditionally bilingual, most prominently in Seeland around the lakes of Morat, Neuchâtel and Bienne (Biel). French is the sole official language in four Swiss cantons: Geneva, Vaud, Neuchâtel, and Jura; and the co-official language – along with German – in the cantons of Valais, Bern, and Fribourg, French speakers forming the majority of the population in the regions of Lower Valais, Bernese Jura and Fribourg francophone ("French-speaking Fribourg"). Bernese Jura is an administrative division of the Canton of Bern, whereas the two others are informal denominations.

French is the sole official language in the following cantons:
Arms (Note: Cantonal coats of arms shown with cantonal heraldic colors (Standesfarben).)	Canton of	Joined Switzerland	Capital	Population (Note: See references for dates)	Area (km^{2})	Density (per km^{2})
Coat of arms of Vaud	Vaud	1803	Lausanne	814,762	3,212	247
Coat of arms of Geneva	Geneva	1815	Geneva	506,343	282	1,756
Coat of arms of Neuchâtel	Neuchâtel	1815/1857	Neuchâtel	175,894	802	222
Coat of arms of Jura	Jura	1979	Delémont	73,709	839	87
Three regions located in French-German bilingual cantons have a French-speaking majority:
Region	Canton of	Joined Switzerland	Largest city	Population	Area (km^{2})	Density (per km^{2})
Fribourg francophone (Note: Two-thirds of the residents of the Canton of Fribourg are French speakers. All districts of the canton have a French-speaking majority except See and Sense.)	Fribourg/Freiburg	1481	Fribourg/Freiburg	235,069 (Note: Only districts with a French-speaking majority included.)	1,264	186
Lower Valais (Note: 90% French speakers. The region includes 8 out of the 13 districts of the canton of Valais.)	Valais/Wallis	1815	Martigny	122,718	1,344	91
Bernese Jura (Note: 90% French speakers. Since 2010, the Bernese Jura has been an administrative arrondissement of the canton of Bern.)	Bern	1814	Moutier	53,721	541	99
Romandy			Geneva	1 951 187	8 284	235

== Geography ==
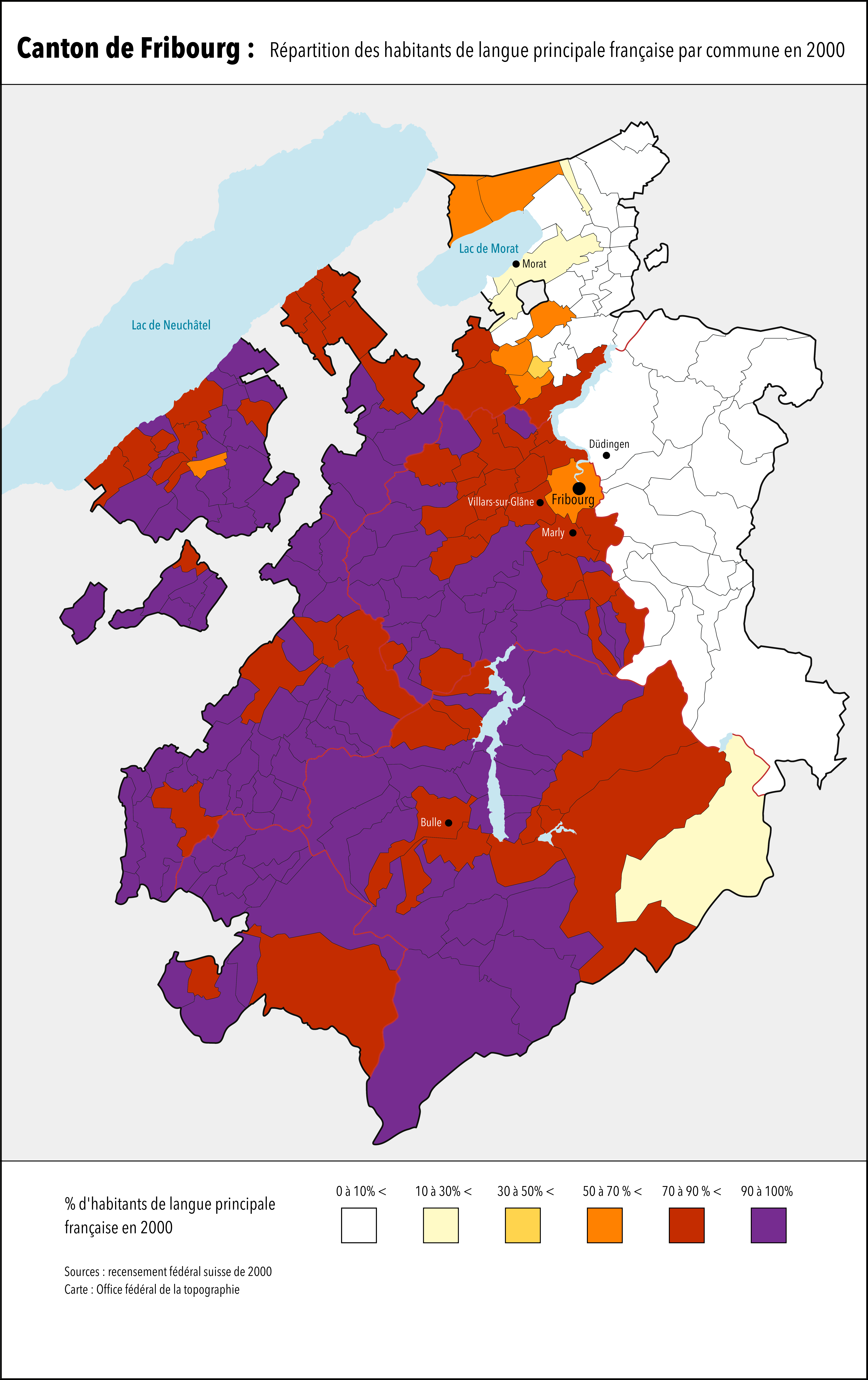
French-speaking population in the Canton of Fribourg in 2000

The linguistic boundary between French and German is known as Röstigraben (lit. "rösti ditch", adopted in Swiss French as barrière de rösti). The term is humorous in origin and refers both to the geographic division and to perceived cultural differences between the Romandy and the German-speaking Swiss majority. The term can be traced to the WWI period, but it entered mainstream usage in the 1970s in the context of the Jurassic separatism virulent at the time. The linguistic boundary cuts across Switzerland north-to-south, forming the eastern boundary of the canton of Jura and then encompassing the Bernese Jura, where the boundary frays to include a number of bilingual communities, the largest of which is Biel/Bienne. It then follows the border between Neuchâtel and Bern and turns south towards Morat, again traversing an areal of traditional bilinguism including the communities of Morat and Fribourg. It divides the canton of Fribourg into a western French-speaking majority and an eastern German-speaking minority and then follows the eastern boundary of Vaud with the upper Saane/Sarine valley of the Bernese Oberland. Cutting across the High Alps at Les Diablerets, the boundary then separates the French-speaking Lower Valais from the Alemannic-speaking Upper Valais beyond Sierre. It then cuts southwards into the High Alps again, separating the Val d'Anniviers from the Mattertal.

Historically, the linguistic boundary in the Swiss Plateau would have more or less followed the Aare during the early medieval period, separating Burgundy (where the Burgundians did not impose their Germanic language on the Gallo-Roman population) from Alemannia; in the High Middle Ages, the boundary gradually shifted westward and now more or less corresponds to the western boundary of the Zähringer possessions, which fell under Bernese rule in the late medieval period, and does not follow any obvious topographical features. The Valais has a separate linguistic history; here, the entire valley, as far as it was settled, would have been Gallo-Roman speaking until its upper parts were settled by Highest Alemannic speakers entering from the Bernese Oberland in the high medieval period (see Walser).

== Language ==
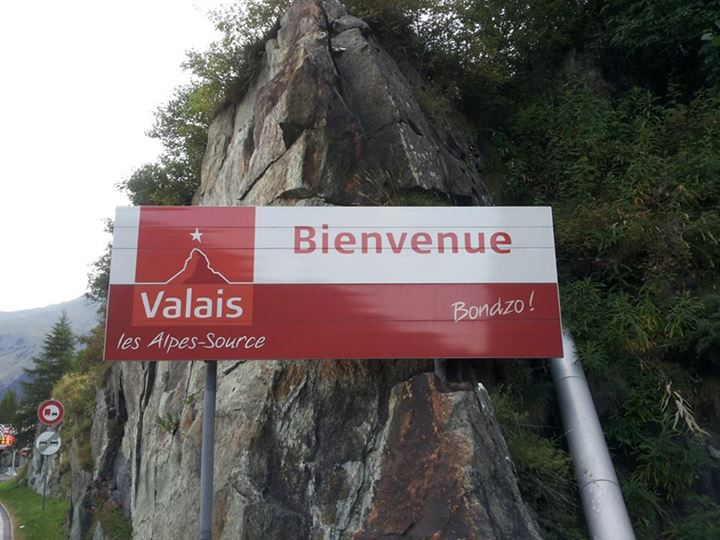
A road sign in Saint-Gingolph, Valais, spelling a Franco-Provençal greeting bondzo! alongside the Standard French bienvenue (2013 photograph)

Traditionally speaking the Franco-Provençal or Patois dialects of Upper Burgundy, the romand population now speak a variety of Standard French.

Today, the differences between Swiss French and Parisian French are minor and mostly lexical, although remnants of dialectal lexicon or phonology may remain more pronounced in rural speakers. In particular, some parts of the Swiss Jura participate in the Frainc-Comtou dialect spoken in the Franche-Comté region of France.

Since the 1970s, there has been a limited amount of linguistic revivalism of Franco-Provençal dialects, which are often now called Arpitan (a 1980s neologism derived from the dialectal form of the word alpine) and their area Arpitania.

== Cultural identity ==
The cultural identity of the Romandy is supported by Radio Télévision Suisse and the universities of Geneva, Fribourg, Lausanne and Neuchâtel.

Historically, most of the Romandy has been strongly Protestant, especially Calvinist; Geneva was one of the earliest and most important Calvinist centres. However, Roman Catholicism continued to predominate in Jura, Valais, and Fribourg. In recent decades, due to significant immigration from France and Southern European countries, Catholics can now be found throughout the region.

The Tour de Romandie is an annual cycling event on the UCI World Tour, often considered to be an important race in preparation for the Tour de France.

The Röstigraben was a divide between areas in Switzerland that also affected their identity. Those in the west looked more to France for policies and political decisions.

== Library Network ==
The Library Network of Western Switzerland is in the region of Romandy.

It is a collection of Libraries of Western Switzerland that are based in the region of Romandy.

== See also ==
- Languages of Switzerland
- Swiss French
- Röstigraben
- Jurassic separatism
- Bernese Jura
- Lake Geneva region
- Rhodanic Republic
- Arpitania
- Organisation internationale de la Francophonie

== Bibliography ==
- Charles-Ferdinand Ramuz, La Suisse romande, Sociétés coopératives Migros romandes, copyright Mme Olivieri-Ramuz, Lausanne, 1955.
- Histoire de la littérature en Suisse romande, vol.4, Lausanne, 1996-1999, republished Geneva, 2015
- Corinne Blanchaud, Dictionnaire des écrivains francophones classiques, Belgique, Canada, Québec, Luxembourg, Suisse romande, Paris, 2013
- Académie de Genève Humbert, Nouveau glossaire genevois, Slatkine, 1983, ISBN 2-05-100516-8, OCLC 715183529.
