= Brünig-Napf-Reuss line =

Linguistic and cultural boundary in Switzerland

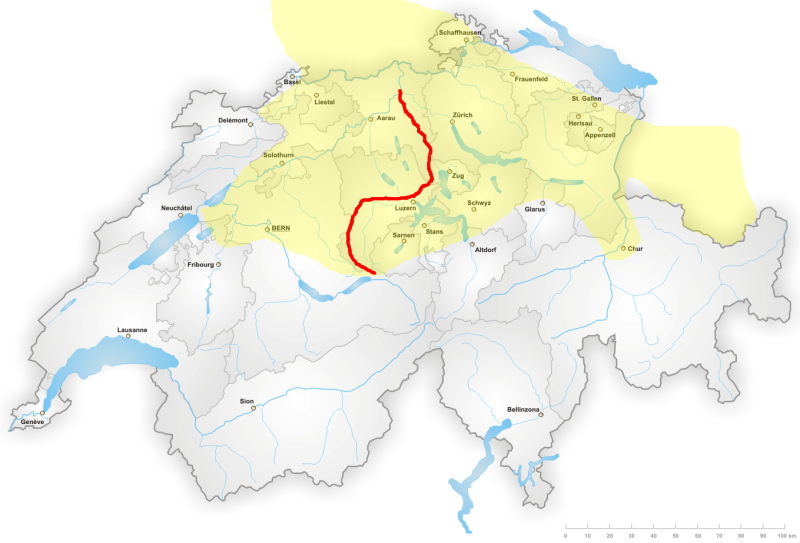
The Brünig-Napf-Reuss line. Marked in yellow is the area of High Alemannic German.

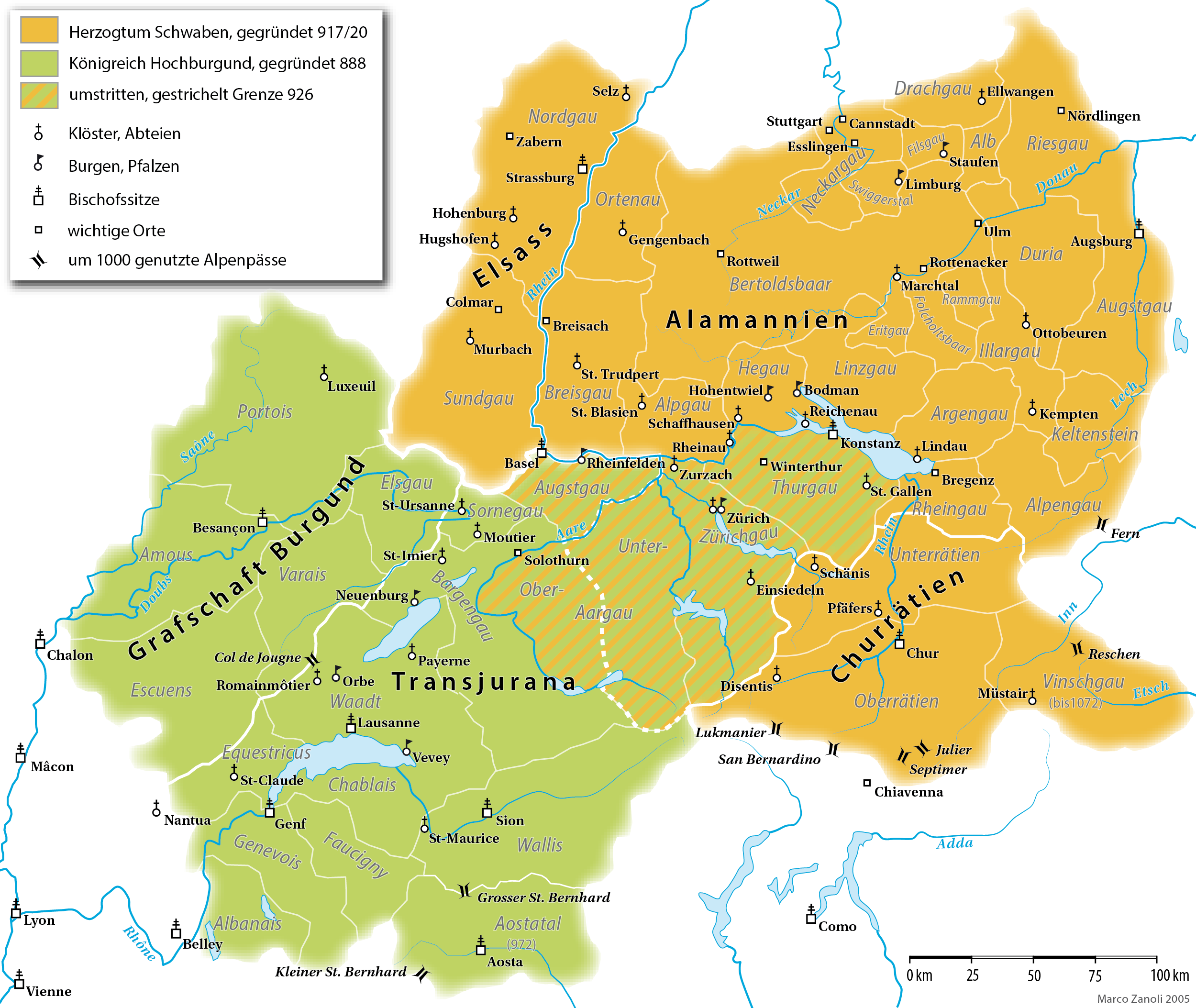
Alemannia and Burgundy, circa AD 1000. The Brünig-Napf-Reuss line runs approximately between Alemannia (orange) and Argovia (striated, disputed territory).

The Brünig-Napf-Reuss line forms a geographical boundary in traditional Swiss culture (Kulturgrenze). Running from the Brünig Pass along the Napf region to the Reuss (which joins the Aare at Brugg), it partly separates western (Bernese German) and eastern (Zurich German) varieties of High Alemannic, although some places east of the line belong to the western dialect group (Schwyz, Zug). The line runs across the cantons of Lucerne and Aargau.

The concept was first proposed by Richard Weiss in 1947, and it reflects the cultural situation in Switzerland as established by ethnographic field work during the early 20th century. Some historians and ethnographers argued that this cultural boundary is of greater importance historically than the French-German language boundary (the Röstigraben), even though it is widely admitted that the "line" doesn't form a sharp division but especially in its northern part "fans out" into a gradient.

The line coincides, for example, with the traditional distribution of Simmental Cattle (west) vs. Braunvieh (east), and with the traditional distribution of French vs. German playing cards. The line also corresponds to the frontline during the Swiss peasant war of 1653. The High Alemannic regions west of the line correspond to medieval Argovia, the marches between Burgundy and Alemannia.

- East of the Brünig-Napf-Reuss line: Schwyz, St. Gallen, Zug, Zürich
- West of the Brünig-Napf-Reuss line: Aarau, Bern, Liestal, Solothurn

== See also ==
- Röstigraben
- Swiss people

== Sources ==
- Helge Gerndt, "Alltagskultur im Alpenraum: regionale Differenzierungen" in Kulturwissenschaft im Zeitalter der Globalisierung (2002), pp. 51–56.
- Richard Weiss, "Die Brünig-Napf-Reuss-Linie als Kulturgrenze zwischen Ost- und West-Schweiz auf Volkskundlichen Karten", Geographica Helvetica 2 (1947), 153-175.
- A Hager, "Die 'Brünig-Napf-Reuss-Linie' von Richard Weis und die Verteilung der Rinderrassen in der Schweiz", Schweizer Volkskunde 72 (1982), 36-41.
