= High Alemannic German =

Dialect of Alemannic German

High Alemannic
- Hochalemannisch
- Native to: Switzerland; Germany: Baden-Württemberg; Austria: Vorarlberg; Liechtenstein; France: Haut-Rhin
- Language family: Indo-European: Germanic; West Germanic; Irminonic; High German; Upper German; Alemannic; High Alemannic
- Writing system: Latin (German alphabet)

Language codes
- ISO 639-3: –
- Glottolog: high1290
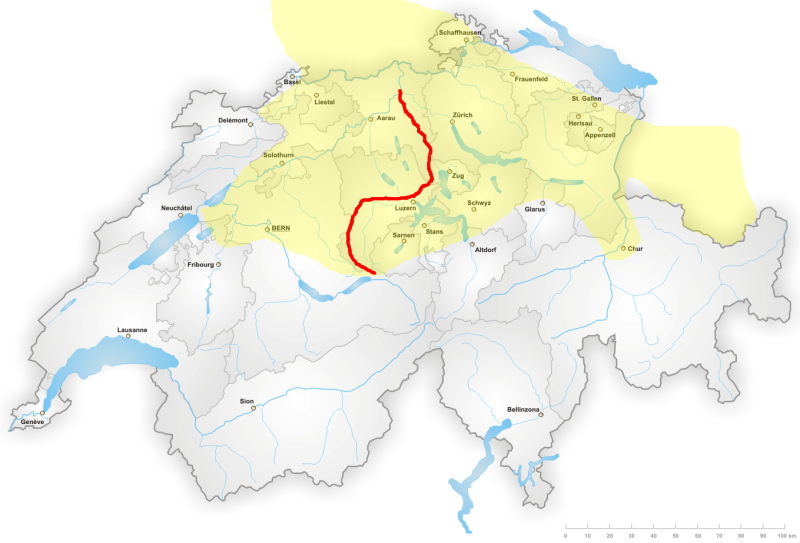
- Geographical spread of High Alemannic dialects; marked in red is the Brünig-Napf-Reuss line

High Alemannic is a branch of Alemannic German spoken in the westernmost Austrian state of Vorarlberg and in Switzerland and Liechtenstein. Intelligibility of these dialects to non-Alemannic speakers tends to be limited.

== Language area ==
The High Alemannic dialects are spoken in Liechtenstein and in most of German-speaking Switzerland (Swiss Plateau), except for the Highest Alemannic dialects in the Swiss Alps and for the Low Alemannic (Basel German) dialect in the North West.

Therefore, High Alemannic must not be confused with the term "Swiss German", which refers to all Alemannic dialects of Switzerland as opposed to Swiss variant of Standard German, the literary language of diglossic German-speaking Switzerland.

In Germany, High Alemannic dialects are spoken in Southern Baden-Württemberg, i.e. the Markgräflerland and in the adjacent area south of Freiburg im Breisgau up to the Black Forest (Schönau). It is also spoken in the southern Sundgau region beyond the Upper Rhine, which is part of Alsace, France. In Vorarlberg in Western Austria, a form of High Alemannic is spoken around the Rheintal as well.

== Subdivisions ==
High Alemannic is traditionally subdivided in an Eastern and Western language area (Sprachraum), marked by the Brünig-Napf-Reuss line across the cantons of Aargau and Lucerne (Luzern).

Eastern High Alemannic includes Zurich German, Lucerne German, and the dialects of Eastern Switzerland.

Western High Alemannic includes Bernese German, the German dialects of Solothurn and Fribourg, as well as most dialects of Aargau and the northern parts of the canton of Lucerne.

== Features ==
The distinctive feature of the High Alemannic dialects is the completion of the High German consonant shift, for instance chalt [xalt] 'cold' vs. Low Alemannic and standard German 'kalt' [kʰalt].
