= Ruth Bietenhard =

Swiss author and translator (1920–2015)

Ruth Bietenhard, née Lehmann (11 January 1920 in Bern – 19 February 2015 in Thun), was a Swiss author and teacher. She became known as the editor of the Bernese German Dictionary and for her Bible translation into Bernese German.

== Life ==
Bietenhard was the daughter of a Bernese notary. She attended the Muristalden Seminary School (Campus Muristalden), the Neue Mädchenschule and the Freies Gymnasium Bern, from which she graduated in 1938 with an A-matura. After studying Romance languages and literature in Bern, Geneva and Paris, she obtained a grammar school teaching diploma in French, Italian and Latin in Bern in 1945 and completed her doctorate in Romance languages and literature here in 1949 with the dissertation Le sémantisme des mots expressifs en Suisse Romande.

In 1969, her great-uncle Otto von Greyerz left her his linguistic legacy of around 5,000 words in Bernese German, from which she published the Bernese German Dictionary in 1976. She later wrote specialised articles and had a column on language and dialect for the newspaper Der Bund until 2003. She taught French at Seminar Thun from 1977 to 1980, taught Bernese German elsewhere and wrote other books. Together with her husband, she translated the New Testament into the Bernese German dialect from 1980 to 1984 and parts of the Old Testament from 1990 to 1994.

In 1946, she married the theologian Hans Bietenhard. They moved to Steffisburg and had six children together. She actively supported her husband until 1969 in building up the Sonnenfeld-Schwäbis parish, which was directly adjacent to the town of Thun. She also served as church council and parish president in Steffisburg. As a conservative woman, she belonged politically to the SVP, although she was also interested in feminist theology.

== Honours ==
- Burger Medal of the City of Bern.
- In 1993, she received an honorary doctorate from the Faculty of Theology of the University of Bern.
- In 1994, together with her husband, she became an honorary citizen of Steffisburg.

== Works ==
- Berndeutsches Wörterbuch (based on the work of Otto von Greyerz, first edition 1976), 9. Edition, 2008, ISBN 978-3-305-00255-9
- Oberländer Mundarten (1991) ISBN 3-85777-129-1
- Ds Nöie Teschtamänt Bärndütsch (together with her husband) (1984) ISBN 3-85570-086-9
- Ds Alte Teschtament bärndütsch (together with her husband and her son Benedikt) (1990) ISBN 3-85570-111-3
- Wörter wandere dür d Jahrhundert (1999) ISBN 3-305-00256-5
