= Hans Bietenhard =

Swiss theologian and professor emeritus (1916–2008)

- Born: May 31, 1916; Olten, Switzerland
- Died: September 5, 2008 (aged 92); Steffisburg, Switzerland
- Spouse: Ruth Bietenhard

Academic background
- Education: University of Basel; University of Bern

Academic work
- Discipline: theology
- Institutions: University of Bern
- Main interests: New Testament
- Notable works: translation of the New Testament into Bernese German

Hans Bietenhard (May 31, 1916, in Olten – September 5, 2008 in Steffisburg) was a Swiss Protestant Reformed pastor, theologian and professor emeritus of New Testament at the University of Bern.

== Life and work ==
Hans Bietenhard was a son of Rudolf Bietenhard (Bernese civil servant) and his wife Rosa Müller, and he grew up in Bern, where he also attended school. From 1945 to 1969 he worked as a Protestant Reformed pastor in Sonnenfeld-Schwäbis, which belongs to Steffisburg.

=== Education ===
He studied Protestant theology in Bern, Basel, Zurich and Paris. He received his ThD at the University of Basel in 1945 and his habilitation at the University of Bern in 1948. In 1946 he married the teacher Ruth Bietenhard, née Lehmann, with whom he had six children. She also supported him in his parish ministry, especially in building up the Sonnenfeld-Schwäbis parish. Together they became honorary citizens of Steffisburg in 1994.

=== Teaching ===
At the University of Bern he taught New Testament as well as History and Theology of Late Judaism from 1948. From 1962 he was employed as a part-time, and from 1969 to 1986 as a full-time extraordinarius of the National Fund at the Faculty of Protestant Theology.

=== Field of work ===
Bietenhard was considered an expert on intertestamental and late Judaism in connection with the New Testament. He translated and commented on Jewish writings such as the Sota, Midrash Tanhuma B and Sifre Deuteronomy. With his wife Ruth Bietenhard, he created the translation of the New Testament into the Bernese German dialect from 1980 to 1984. From 1990 to 1994 they translated parts of the Old Testament, in which their eldest son and Hebraist Benedikt Bietenhard also assisted.

== Bibliography ==
=== Books ===
- Bietenhard, Hans (1951). Die himmlische Welt im Urchristentum und Spätjudentum. Wissenschaftliche Untersuchungen zum Neuen Testament. Mohr. doi:10.1628/978-3-16-157415-3 (inactive 12 July 2025). ISBN 978-3-16-157415-3.
- Bietenhard, Hans (1972). Caesarea, Origenes und die Juden. W. Kohlhammer. ISBN 9783170017221.
- Bietenhard, H. (1984). "Der tannaitische Midrasch Sifre Deuteronomium". Judaica et Christiana. 8. ISBN 3261033118.

=== Articles ===
- Bietenhard, H. (1953). "The Millennial Hope in the Early Church". Scottish Journal of Theology. 6 (1): 12–30. doi:10.1017/S0036930600005317.
- Bietenhard, H. (1963). "Die Dekapolis von Pompeius bis Traian: Ein Kapitel aus der neutestamentlichen Zeitgeschichte". Zeitschrift des Deutschen Palästina-Vereins. 79 (1): 24–58. JSTOR 27930676.
- Bietenhard, Hans (1978). "Die syrische Dekapolis von Pompeius bis Traían". In Temporini, Hildegard; Haase, Wolfgang (eds.). Politische Geschichte (Provinzen und Randvölker: Syrien, Palästina, Arabien). Vol. 8. Berlin, Boston: De Gruyter. pp. 220–261. doi:10.1515/9783110866940-009. ISBN 9783110866940.

== Sources ==
- Girsberger, Hans (1987). Who's who in Switzerland Including the Principality of Liechtenstein. Central European Times Publishing Company Limited.
- Kittel, Gerhard; Bromiley, Geoffrey William; Friedrich, Gerhard; Pitkin, Ronald E., eds. (1964). Theological Dictionary of the New Testament. Vol. 10. Translated by Bromiley, Geoffrey William. Wm. B. Eerdmans Publishing. ISBN 9780802823236. }
- Masson, Ch. (1951). "Review of Die himmlische Welt im Urchristentum und Spätjudentum. Wissenschaftliche Untersuchungen zum Neuen Testament, by H. Bietenhard". Revue de Théologie et de Philosophie. 1 (2): 145–146. JSTOR 44356002.
- Mathys, Hans-Peter (2008-09-11). "Hans Bietenhard".
- May, E. (1953). "Review of Die himmlische Welt in Urchristentum und Spätjudentum, by H. Bietenhard". The Catholic Biblical Quarterly. 15 (2): 267–269. JSTOR 43724035.
- Sury, Alexander (2015-02-25). "Gschyd, gschickt und gwaglet". Bund.
- Traber, Barbara (1987). Schmid-Cadalbert, Christian (ed.). Gredt u gschribe: eine Anthologie neuer Mundartliteratur der deutschen Schweiz. Verlag Sauerländer. ISBN 9783794129409.
- "Hans Bietenhard". Archived from the original on 2018-12-23.
