= Basel German =

Dialect of the city of Basel, Switzerland

Basel German or Baseldytsch (Standard German: Baseldeutsch) is the dialect of the city of Basel, Switzerland. The dialect of Basel forms a Low Alemannic linguistic exclave in the High Alemannic region.

== Phonetics and phonology ==
=== Consonants ===
==== Aspirated plosives ====
Basel German is characterised by aspirates /kʰ, tʰ, pʰ/ which are absent or at least less common in other dialects. Compare Basel German Khind (usually spelled Kind), pronounced more or less as Standard German Kind, with Chind with initial /x-/, used in all other Swiss German dialects, with the exception of the dialect of Chur. Thus, Basel German did not complete the second Germanic sound shift (High German consonant shift). Nowadays, many speakers pronounce the /x-/ (or [χ], to be more exact), however. There are nevertheless still words that are never pronounced with /x-/, for example kenne (Standard German kennen, 'to know') or Keenig/König (Standard German König). Typically, words from Standard German or Latin are pronounced with aspirated /kʰ, pʰ, tʰ/, too, which is not or only to a lesser extent done in other dialects.

Examples: phee or pee (name of letter), bhalte or phalte ('to keep'), Phaargg or Pargg ('park'); Thee or Tee ('tea' and name of letter), tholl or toll ('great, swell'); ka(a)/khaa, gghaa (name of letter; 'had'), Kaschte/Khaschte ('cupboard'), gheie or kheje ('to fall, throw').

==== Affricates ====
Like other dialects and forms of the standard, Basel German has /pf, ts/ as well as /tʃ/.

Examples: Pfanne ('pan'), Zaan ('tooth'), dütsch ('German'), Tschooli ('stupid person', traditional word), Tschoope "jacket" (a traditional word), tschegge ('to understand', from English to check).

==== Pronunciation of /r/ phoneme ====
A French-style pronunciation of /r/ as [ʁ] is also used in Basel German, although many younger speakers—especially those with foreign parents—also use a tapped [r] which is more common in other Swiss German dialects. Traditionally, /r/ is voiceless [χ], and it may sometimes be described as a lenis /x/. The pronunciation per se seems to derive from French (originally Parisian), and was probably re-interpreted as a lenis /x/ according to Basel German phonology. Not surprisingly, French influence was for a long time dominant in Basel, with well-to-do families speaking French even at home. At least in clusters, the distinction between /x/ and /r/ is neutralised, as is the distinction between lenis and fortis consonants in clusters.

==== Lenition of consonants ====
Basel German also has more lenis sounds in word-initial position—for example, Dag ('day'). This lenition is now often absent due to influence from other dialects, for example, the name of Santa Claus, Santiglaus, is now often pronounced with /kʰ/ or /x/, as is the word Graft (Standard German Kraft), which traditionally has a lenis sound, now also /kʰ/ and /x/.

==== Lenis plosives ====
Lenis plosives are however all voiceless; whereas fortis plosives are long or geminated. They are (like other lenis or short consonants) always preceded by long vowels, with the possible exception of unstressed vowels. According to Pilch, vowel length is not distinctive; however, vowel length is not always predictable: /roːttə/ 'to guess' has both a long vowel and a long/geminated consonant.

Examples: Dag /tɑːk/ ('day'), umme /ʊmə/ ('around'), ane /ɑːnə/ ('there'), loose or lohse /loːsə/ ('listen'), Gaas /kɑːs/ ('gas'). Phonemically speaking, /p t k/ may also be (more traditionally) transcribed /b d ɡ/, or as unvoiced /b d ɡ/.

==== Fortis consonants ====
Fortis or long consonants in general are more stable than in other dialects—'to swim' is always schwimme, whereas it is pronounced with only a short /m/ in other dialects. This is probably because in stressed words, short vowels only appear before double or geminated/long consonants. Hence, a word like /ˈʃvʏmə/ is not possible in Basel German. As in other dialects, the difference between fortis and lenis is in length. Pilch (180) however interprets /tt/ as alveolar, not long. Fortis consonants may also be transcribed /bb dd ɡɡ/, since lenis /p t k/ are often transcribed as /b d ɡ/. However, voicing is always absent.

Examples: schwimme ('to swim'), phagge ('to pack'), drugge ('to squeeze'), roott ('to guess' — note the long /oː/ followed by fortis /tt/)

=== Vowels ===
==== Unrounding of vowels ====
Unrounding was also typical, but now it has been abandoned by many speakers. Lengthening of vowels is also found, linking it more closely to Standard German than all other Swiss German dialects.

Examples: griezi ('good day'; grüezi in other dialects, still more common), Hell ('hell', now rounded form more common), greescht ('biggest, greatest'; now grööscht more common).

==== Lengthening and shortening of vowels ====
Lengthening always occurs before lenis (short) consonants, for example in words like Daag ('day'), loose ('listen'), miir ('we'). Shortening, on the other hand, always occurs before long or fortis consonants, for example in Baseldytsch, the name of the dialect: whereas other dialects have long /yː/ in Baseldütsch or any other word with -dütsch ('German') in it, Basel German always has short /i/ or /y/. /a:/ and /o:/ (as well as /ø:/), however, are usually not shortened, probably because of the shift from earlier /a:/ to /o:/. Another reason may be the fact that those are the only vowels that exist as such only as long vowels, i.e. whereas [i:] can be shortened to [i], it is never possible to shorten [e:] to [e] because *[e] as such does not exist in Basel German. Some speakers, however, use short open vowels in a number of words, e.g. /hɔkkə/ instead of /ho:kkə/ ('hook'). Those speakers who use this pronunciation lack one minimal pair, since /hɔkkə/ also translates as 'crouch'. However, this shortening of /o:/ /ø:/ /a:/ /æ:/ is not general. Note however that /a:/ exists mainly in words of foreign origin such as /sa'la:tt/.

==== Velarisation of MHG /a:/ ====
Middle High German /aː/ was velarised and appears as /oː/. For example, Strooss /ʃtroːss/ 'street'.

==== Vowels before /r/ ====
Typically (but not exclusively) open vowels occur before /r/; for example, Oor ('ear') has the allophone [ɔː], not [oː]. Both [ɔː] and [ɛː] only occur before /r/ in native words.

Additionally, vowels before /r/ are always long, with the exception of loan words such as [ˈsɔri] 'sorry', [ˈkʰœri] 'curry' as well as unstressed vowels.

Examples: Oor [ɔːr] 'ear', Eer [ɛːr] 'honour'.

==== Pronunciation of /a/ /a:/ ====
The vowels /a/ and /aː/ traditionally are front, yet distinct from /æ/ and /æː/. Nowadays, a back pronunciation /ɑ/ and /ɑː/ is more common. Examples: Sagg ('bag'), Baasel ('Basel').

==== Diphthongs ====
Modern pronunciation has /aj/, /aːj/, /ej/ [ɛj], /aw/, /aːw/, /iə/, /uə/ and /œj/; traditional pronunciation lacks /œj/ which is partly /aj/, partly /ej/. In modern pronunciation /aj/, /aːj/, /aw/, /aːw/ are [æj], [æːj] [æw], [æːw], whereas traditional pronunciation has [aj], [aw] etc. Suter (1992: 11) posits only one diphthong /au/, pronounced [æːw]. In exclamations and few other words, [uj ɔw] also exist.

Examples: eläi ('alone'), draaie ('to turn'), drei ('three'), baue ('to build'), blaau ('blue'), vier ('four'), zue ('shut'), nöi ('new'); nei ('traditional').

== Sociolinguistics ==
Unlike other Alemannic dialects, Basel German features a rather strong dichotomy between the traditional form—Baseldytsch, used especially for the Carnival of Basel (Basler Fasnacht)—and normal spoken language. Some speakers prefer to use the more traditional variety in written form. The traditional variety is normally associated with the upper classes and with Fasnacht. Like other Swiss German dialects, Basel German has (at least in Basel) more prestige than Standard German, and it is now even used in churches.

== Spelling ==
There is a lot of confusion especially when it comes to the use of the grapheme ⟨y⟩, which is often used for rounded sounds, i.e. /ʏ/ or /y/, whereas it is exclusively used for /i/ traditionally. Typically, lenis stops are spelled ⟨b⟩, ⟨d⟩, ⟨g⟩, fortis stops are spelled ⟨p⟩, ⟨pp⟩, sometimes ⟨bb⟩ (öpper, öbber, ebber 'someone'); ⟨t⟩, ⟨tt⟩, sometimes ⟨dd⟩ (Middi 'middle'); ⟨gg⟩, rarely and mainly in loan-words ⟨k⟩, ⟨ck⟩, etc. This use of ⟨gg⟩ for the fortis, unaspirated consonant is used also in other varieties of Swiss German, but sometimes abandoned in favour of spellings more closely resembling Standard German spellings. Examples: drugge ('to push'), Läggerli (typical sweet cookie; but also Läckerli), Sagg ('bag'; but sometimes also Sack), Gugge ('bag', traditional word). The fortis /xx/ is always spelled like lenis /x/, namely ⟨ch⟩. The same is true for /ʃʃ/.

Obviously, especially the typical use of ⟨y⟩ and ⟨gg⟩ leads to confusion, even among native speakers, since the dialect is not taught in schools. Aspirates are normally spelled as in Standard German, namely with ⟨p⟩, ⟨t⟩, ⟨k⟩. However, words where the aspirates derive from a lenis consonant plus /h/ are usually written as lenis plus ⟨h⟩, e.g., bhalte 'to keep', gheie 'to fall'.

== Terminology ==
Baseldytsch reflects traditional pronunciation with /i/, Baseldütsch reflects modern pronunciation with /y/, whereas Baseldeutsch is the Standard German form. Baslerdüütsch may be used in other dialects.
