= Kilch =

Kilch, also spelled kilchen or kilchenfisch, is a term in German and Swiss German for these species of freshwater whitefish:

- Coregonus bavaricus
- Coregonus pidschian
- Coregonus lavaretus
- Coregonus gutturosus
