= Highest Alemannic German =

Branch of Alemannic German

- Höchstalemannisch
- Region: the Alps
- Native speakers: 4,500,000 Swiss German (2012); 10,000 Walser (2004)
- Language family: Indo-European: Germanic; West Germanic; Elbe Germanic; High German; Upper German; Alemannic German; Highest Alemannic German

Language codes
- ISO 639-3: Either: gsw – Swiss German (partial) wae – Walser German
- Glottolog: None
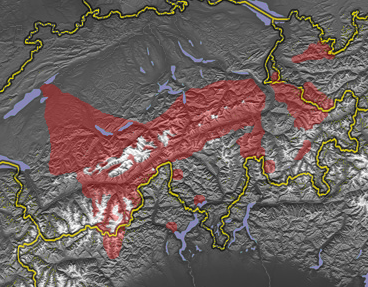
- Areas where Highest Alemannic dialects are spoken are marked in red.

Highest Alemannic is a branch of Alemannic German and is often considered to be part of the German language, even though mutual intelligibility with Standard German and other non-Alemannic German dialects is very limited.

Highest Alemannic dialects are spoken in alpine regions of Switzerland: the Bernese Oberland, in the German-speaking parts of the Canton of Fribourg and Valais, and in the Walser settlements (mostly in Switzerland, but also in Italy and in Austria; see Walser German). In the West, the South and the South-East, they are surrounded by Romance languages; in the North, by High Alemannic dialects. In the Swiss canton of Graubünden (Grisons) only the Walser exclaves in the Romansh part and the Prättigau, Schanfigg and Davos are Highest Alemannic; the Rhine Valley with Chur and Engadin are High Alemannic.

== Features ==
The distinctive feature of the Highest Alemannic dialects is the lack of hiatus diphthongization, for instance [ˈʃniː.ə(n)] 'to snow', [ˈb̥uː.ə(n)] 'to build' vs. High Alemannic [ˈʃnei̯jə], [ˈb̥ou̯wə].

Many High Alemannic dialects have different verbal plural endings for all three persons, for instance wir singe(n) 'we sing', ir singet 'you (plural) sing', si singent 'they sing'. Almost all other German dialects use the same ending for the first and third persons in the plural.

There are High Alemannic dialects that have preserved the ending -n which has been dropped in most Upper German dialects.

The Highest Alemannic dialects are considered to be the most conservative dialects of German. The dialect of the Lötschental, for instance, preserved the three distinct classes of weak verbs (as in Old High German) until the beginning of the 20th century.
