= Swiss Standard German =

Variety of Standard German

- Swiss High German (Note: High German can refer to Standard German or to the regional variety group with the same name.)
- Schweizer Standarddeutsch; Schweizer Hochdeutsch, Schweizerhochdeutsch
- Pronunciation: [ˈʃvaɪtsərˌʃtandarddɔʏtʃ], [ˈʃvaɪtsərˌhoːxdɔʏtʃ]
- Region: Switzerland, Liechtenstein
- Ethnicity: Swiss (Liechtensteiners)
- Language family: Indo-European: Germanic; West Germanic; High German; Standard German; Swiss Standard German
- Standard forms: Swiss Standard German; Liechtensteiner Standard German

Official status
- Official language in: Switzerland; Liechtenstein

Language codes
- ISO 639-3: –
- Glottolog: None
- IETF: de-CH

Swiss Standard German (SSG; German: Schweizer Standarddeutsch), or Swiss High German (German: Schweizer Hochdeutsch or Schweizerhochdeutsch; Romansh: Svizzers Alt Tudestg), referred to by the Swiss as Schriftdeutsch, or German: Hochdeutsch, is the written form of one (German) of four national languages in Switzerland, besides French, Italian, and Romansh. It is a variety of Standard German, used in the German-speaking part of Switzerland and in Liechtenstein. It is mainly written and rather less often spoken.

Swiss Standard German differs from Swiss German, an umbrella term for the various Alemannic German dialects (in the sense of "traditional regional varieties") that are the default everyday languages in German-speaking Switzerland.

Standard German is a pluricentric language. In contrast with other local varieties of Standard German, Swiss Standard German has distinctive features in all linguistic domains: not only in phonology, but also in vocabulary, syntax, morphology, and orthography. These characteristics of Swiss Standard German are called Helvetisms. Besides influences from Alemannic German, those characteristics include extensive use of loan words from Romance languages, especially French.

== Written Swiss Standard German ==
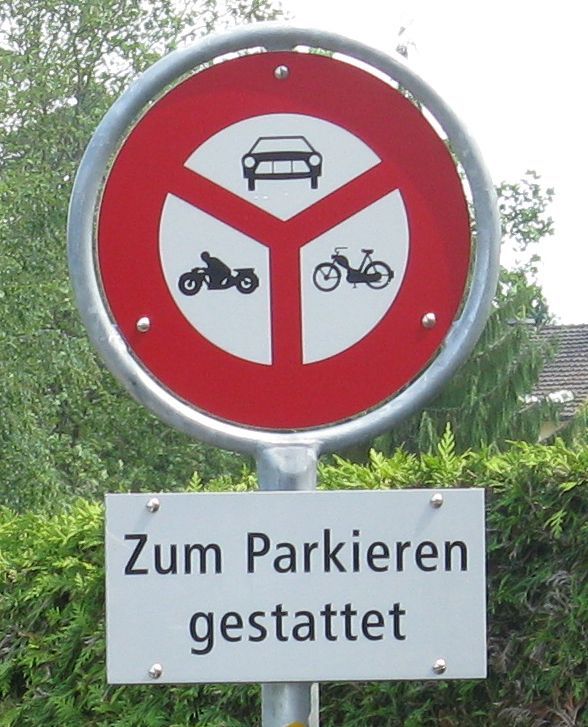
Helvetism: parkieren

Swiss Standard German is the official written language in German-speaking Switzerland and Liechtenstein. It is used in books, all official publications (including all laws and regulations), in newspapers, printed notices, most advertising, and other printed matter. Authors write literature mainly using Swiss Standard German; some dialect literature exists. SSG is similar in most respects to the Standard German in Germany and Austria; there are a few differences in spelling, most notably the replacing of the German ß with ss (since the 20th century). For example:

Swiss Standard German	Standard German outside Switzerland and Liechtenstein	English
Strasse	Straße	street
gross	groß	big
Fussball	Fußball	football
süss	süß	sweet
weiss, Weiss	weiß, Weiß	white
fliessen	fließen	to flow

There are some differences in vocabulary, including, for instance, using a loanword from another language. For example:

Swiss Standard German	Standard German outside Switzerland and Liechtenstein	English
Billett	Fahrkarte	ticket (for bus/tram/train etc.)
bostitchen (genericization of Bostitch)	tackern	to staple
Brockenhaus	Secondhandladen or Secondhandshop	second-hand shop/thrift store
Camion	Lastwagen	Lorry/truck
Cornet	Eiswaffel, (Note: only used in Germany) Stanitzel (Note: only used in Austria)	ice cream cone
demissionieren	zurücktreten	to resign (from office)
Führerausweis, Fahrausweis, or Billet (Note: Colloquial term)	Führerschein	driving licence
Flaumer (Note: Regional term)	Mopp	mop (with thrums)
Gletteisen	Bügeleisen	clothes iron
grillieren	grillen	to grill
Immatrikulation	Fahrzeugzulassung	vehicle registration
Jupe (Note: The French pronunciation is used)	Rock	skirt
Lavabo	Waschbecken	washbasin/sink
Natel or Handy	Handy or Mobiltelefon	mobile phone
Ofenküchlein	Windbeutel, Brandteigkrapferl	cream puff
parkieren	parken	to park
Passerelle	Fußgängerbrücke	footbridge/pedestrian bridge
Peperoncino	Peperoni/Chili, Pfefferoni	chili pepper
Peperoni	Paprika	bell pepper
Poulet	Hähnchen	chicken
rapportieren	berichten	to report
Rande	Rote Bete, Rote Rübe	beetroot
Rüebli	Karotte	carrot
Sack	Tasche	pocket
Samariter(in)	Sanitäter(in)	paramedic
schnöden	spotten	to scoff
Signallicht	Verkehrsampel	traffic light
süsser or scharfer Paprika	Paprika	paprika
Velo	Fahrrad	bicycle
Zucchetti	Zucchini	zucchini/courgette

In addition, SSG uses different orthography in letter writing, and the salutations used for the same also differ from Non-Swiss Standard German.

The Swiss use the Standard German word Spital (hospital). Spital is also found in volumes of Standard German language dictionaries; however, Germans from northern Germany prefer to use Krankenhaus, whereas Spital is also used in areas of southern Germany, Austria, Liechtenstein, and South Tyrol.

Some nouns have different gender:

- de-CH: das Tram (neuter); de: die Tram (feminine) (Straßenbahn is used more frequently in Germany); en: tram
- de-CH: das E-Mail (neuter); de: die E-Mail (feminine); en: e-mail

Some expressions are borrowed from French and thus differ from usage in Germany, such as

- de-CH: ich habe kalt (literally "I have cold"), de: mir ist [es] kalt (literally "[it] is cold to me")
- de-CH: das geht dir gut, de: das passt dir gut (it suits you)

The Swiss keyboard layout has no ß key, nor does it have the capital umlaut keys Ä, Ö and Ü. This dates back to mechanical typewriters that had the French diacritical marks letters on these keys to allow the Swiss to write French on a Swiss German QWERTZ keyboard (and vice versa). Thus a Swiss German VSM keyboard has an ä key that prints an à (a-grave) when shifted. However, it is possible to write uppercase umlauts by use of caps lock or by using the ¨ dead key.

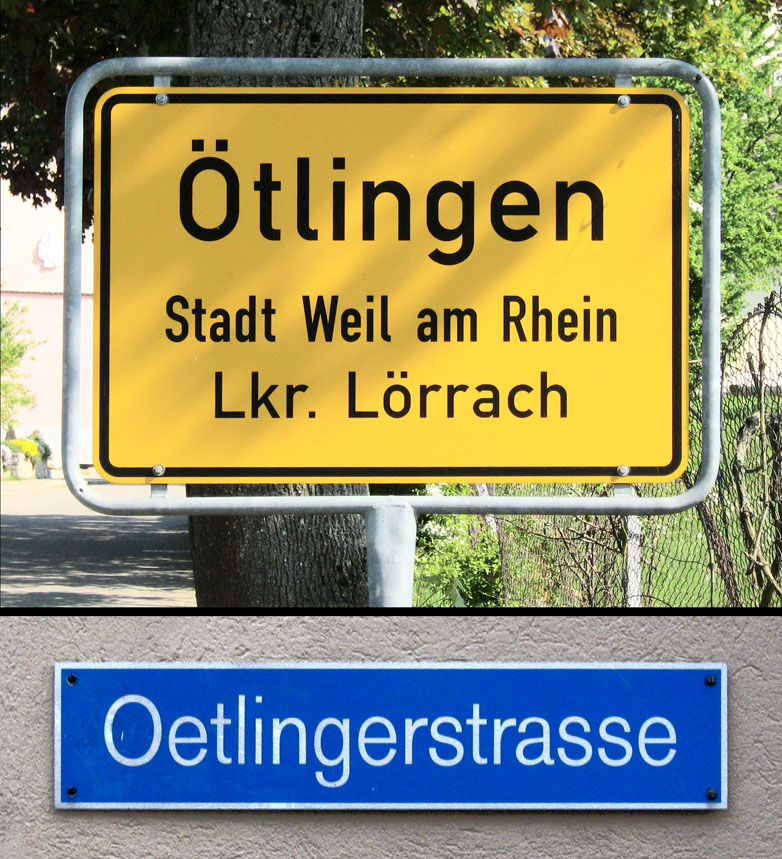
The Oetlingerstrasse in Basel is named after the town of Ötlingen in Baden-Württemberg, and it uses the spelling commonly used in Switzerland (Oe for Ö and ss for ß).

The names of municipalities, towns, stations, and streets are often not written with a starting capital umlaut, but instead with Ae, Oe, or Ue, such as the Zurich suburb Oerlikon, the hamlet Aetzikofen, and the Bernese municipality Uebeschi. However, field names, such as Äbenegg, Ötikon (near Stäfa), or Überthal, and any other word, such as Ärzte (English: physicians), usually start with capital umlauts.

As for the various dialects of Swiss German, they are occasionally written, but their written usage is mostly restricted to informal situations such as private text messages, e-mails, letters, notes, or within social media such as Facebook. The ability of German Swiss to transliterate their language into writing is an integral and important part of the identity and culture of German-speaking Switzerland.

== Spoken Swiss Standard German ==
The default spoken language in German-speaking Switzerland is the respective local dialect. Due to a rather large inter-cantonal migration rate (about 5% p.a.) within modern Switzerland for decades, many different Swiss German dialects are spoken in any one place, especially in urban areas; for example, in the city of Zurich (end of 2013): of the 272,700 Swiss (total: 400,000) living in Zurich, only 40% (28%) are from Zurich itself with 51% (36%) from the entire canton of Zurich.

Outside of any educational setting, Swiss Standard German is only spoken in very few specific formal situations, such as in news broadcasts and reputable programmes of the public media channels; in the parliaments of German-speaking cantons; in the federal parliament in Bern (unless another official language of Switzerland is used), although dialect is certainly encroaching on this domain; in loudspeaker announcements in public places such as railway stations, etc. Church services, including the sermon and prayers, are usually in Swiss Standard German. Generally in any educational setting Swiss Standard German is used (during lessons, lectures or tutorials). However, outside of lessons Swiss-German dialects are used, even when, for example, talking to a teacher about the class. The situations in which Swiss Standard German is spoken are characteristically formal and public, and there are situations where written communication is also important.

In informal situations, Swiss Standard German is only used whenever a German Swiss is communicating with a non-Swiss and it is assumed that this person does not understand the respective dialect. Amongst themselves, the German-speaking Swiss use their respective Swiss German dialect, irrespective of social class, education or topic.

Unlike other regions where German varieties are spoken, there is no continuum between Swiss Standard German and the Swiss German dialects. The speakers speak either Swiss Standard German, or a Swiss German dialect, and they are conscious about this choice.

Nevertheless, about 10%, or 828,200, of Swiss residents speak High German (also called Standard German) at home, but mainly due to the presence of German or Austrian immigrants.

== Diglossia ==
The concurrent usage of Swiss Standard German and Swiss German dialects has been called a typical case of diglossia, although this term is often reserved to language pairs where the vernacular has lower prestige than the other, while Swiss German dialects do not meet this criterion as they permeate every socio-economic class of society. Since Swiss Standard German is the usual written language and the Swiss German dialects are the usual spoken language, their interrelation has sometimes been called a medial diglossia instead.

== Attitude to spoken Swiss Standard German ==
Most German Swiss can speak fluent Swiss Standard German, but may or may not like doing so, as it feels stilted and unnatural to many. When they compare their Swiss Standard German to the way people from Germany speak, they think their own proficiency is inferior because it is studied and slower. Most German Swiss think that the majority speak rather poor Swiss Standard German; however, when asked about their personal proficiency, a majority will answer that they speak quite well.

== Literature ==
- Ammon, Ulrich; Bickel, Hans; Ebner, Jakob; Gasser, Markus; Esterhammer, Ruth (2004), Ammon, Ulrich; et al. (eds.), Variantenwörterbuch des Deutschen. Die Standardsprache in Österreich, der Schweiz und Deutschland sowie in Liechtenstein, Luxemburg, Ostbelgien und Südtirol (in German), Berlin/New York, ISBN 978-3-11-016575-3
  - Ammon, Ulrich; Bickel, Hans; Lenz, Alexandra N., eds. (2016), Variantenwörterbuch des Deutschen. Die Standardsprache in Österreich, der Schweiz, Deutschland, Liechtenstein, Luxemburg, Ostbelgien und Südtirol sowie Rumänien, Namibia und Mennonitensiedlungen (in German) (2nd ed.), De Gruyter
- Bickel, Hans; Landolt, Christoph (2012), Duden. Schweizerhochdeutsch. Wörterbuch der Standardsprache in der deutschen Schweiz (in German), Mannheim/Zürich: Schweizerischer Verein für die deutsche Sprache, ISBN 978-3-411-70417-0
- Dürscheid, Christa; Businger, Martin, eds. (2006), Schweizer Standarddeutsch: Beiträge zur Varietätenlinguistik, Tübingen, Germany: Narr Francke Attempto, ISBN 978-3-8233-6225-8
- Hägi, Sara (2006), Nationale Varietäten im Unterricht Deutsch als Fremdsprache (in German), Frankfurt am Main, Germany u. a., ISBN 978-3-631-54796-0
- Hägi, Sara; Scharloth, Joachim (March 2005), Ist Standarddeutsch für Deutschschweizer eine Fremdsprache? - Untersuchungen zu einem Topos des sprachreflexiven Diskurses, Linguistik online (in German), archived from the original on 2011-09-29
- Heule, Martin (19 September 2006), Ist der Dialekt an allem schuld? (radio broadcast), Kontext (in German), Basel, Switzerland: SRG SSR idée suisse SRF 2, archived from the original (mp3) on 2016-01-25
- Hove, Ingrid (22 June 2007). Schweizer Hochdeutsch. Die Aussprache des Deutschen in der Schweiz (PDF) (Speech). Jahrestagung des Schweizerischen Vereins für die deutsche Sprache und der Gesellschaft für deutsche Sprache (in German). Lucerne, Switzerland.
- Krech, Eva Maria; Stock, Eberhard; Hirschfeld, Ursula; Anders, Lutz-Christian (2009), "Die Standardaussprache in der deutschsprachigen Schweiz", Deutsches Aussprachewörterbuch, Berlin, New York: Walter de Gruyter, ISBN 978-3-11-018202-6
- von Matt, Peter (2012), "Deutsch in der Deutschen Schweiz", in Peter von Matt (ed.), Das Kalb vor der Gotthardpost. Zur Literatur und Politik in der Schweiz (in German), München, Germany: Carl Hanser Verlag, pp. 127–138, ISBN 978-3-446-23880-0
- Meyer, Kurt (2006), Schweizer Wörterbuch. So sagen wir in der Schweiz (in German), Frauenfeld, Switzerland, ISBN 978-3-7193-1382-1
- Russ, Charles (1994), The German Language Today: A Linguistic Introduction, London: Routledge, ISBN 978-0-203-42577-0
- Scharloth, Joachim (June 2004), "6.1. Standardvariationen und Sprachauffassungen in verschiedenen Sprachkulturen [Standard Variations and Conceptions of Language in Various Language Cultures]", Zwischen Fremdsprache und nationaler Varietät: Untersuchungen zum Plurizentrizitätsbewusstsein der Deutschschweizer, Internet-Zeitschrift für Kulturwissenschaften (in German), Graz, Austria: Rudolf Muhr (Universität Graz)
- Siebenhaar, Beat; Wyler, Alfred (1997), Dialekt und Hochsprache in der deutschsprachigen Schweiz (PDF) (in German) (5 ed.), Zurich, Switzerland: Pro Helvetia
- Siebenhaar, Beat (n.d.), Das Verhältnis von Mundarten und Standardsprache in der deutschen Schweiz (PDF) (in German), ???: ???
