= Bernese German =

Dialect of High Alemannic German

- Bärndütsch
- Pronunciation: [ˈb̥ærnd̥ytʃ]
- Native to: Canton of Bern
- Language family: Indo-European: Germanic languages; West Germanic; High German; Upper German; Alemannic; High Alemannic; Bernese German
- Writing system: Latin script

Language codes
- ISO 639-3: –
- Glottolog: bern1242
- Linguasphere: 52-ACB-fc
- IETF: gsw-u-sd-chbe

Bernese German (Standard German: Berndeutsch, Alemannic German: Bärndütsch) is the dialect of High Alemannic German spoken in the Swiss Central Plateau (Mittelland) part of the canton of Bern and in some neighbouring regions. A form of Bernese German is spoken by the Swiss Amish affiliation of the Old Order Amish in Adams County, Indiana, United States, as well as and other settlements in the US, primarily in Indiana.

== Varieties ==
There is a lot of regional variation within Bernese German dialects. However, with the increasing importance of the big agglomeration of Bern, the variety of Bern is spreading out, levelling the old village dialects.

Until the second half of the 20th century, there was a considerable range of sociolects in the city of Bern where four different groups could be distinguished:

- The patrician Bernese German of the high society. It has neither l-vocalisation nor nd-velarisation, it does not employ the alveolar trill but the French uvular trill, and it has more French loanwords than the other varieties.
- The variety of the native city population.
- The varieties of the countryside people who moved into the city.
- The variety of the – generally poor – people living in the part of the old town called Matte, known as Mattenenglisch (Matte-English), even though it has little relation with English, but has a number of loans from Jenisch, Rotwelsch and Yiddish. In addition to it, there was also a special kind of Pig Latin which is the proper Mattenenglisch according to some people.

== Phonology ==
Bernese German is distinguished from other Swiss German dialects by the following characteristics:

- The shortening of many high vowels, e.g. Zyt [tsit] 'time', Lüt [lyt] 'people', lut [lut] 'loud' instead of the long vowel typical in other Alemannic dialects, e.g. Zurich German Ziit [tsiːt], Lüüt [lyːt], luut [luːt] (Standard German Zeit, Leute, laut).
- The l-vocalization, e.g. Hauue [ˈhɑu̯wə] 'hall', Esu [ˈɛz̥u] 'donkey' instead of Halle, Esel. This has led to an expanded repertoire of diphthongs and triphthongs, e.g. euter [ˈɛu̯tər] 'older', Seeu [ˈz̥ɛːu̯] 'soul', Schueu [ˈʒ̊uə̯u̯] 'school'.
- The velarization of nd to ng, e.g. angers [ˈɑŋːərs] 'different' (compare Standard German anders). The many words ending with -ng created the joke that Bernese sounds almost like Chinese: Schang gang hei, d Ching wei Hung [ʒ̊ɑŋː ɡ̊ɑŋː hɛj kχiŋː ʋɛj hʊŋɡ̊] 'Schang (Jean) go home, the kids want honey(bread)'.
- As in other Western High Alemannic dialects, words such as Fleisch [v̥lɛi̯ʒ̊] 'flesh' and Oug [ɔu̯ɡ̊] 'eye' are pronounced with the diphthongs /ei/ and /ou/, and not /aɪ/ and /aʊ/.

== Pragmatics ==
As in other Western Swiss German dialects and as in French, the polite form of address is the second person plural and not the third person plural as in Standard German.

== Grammar ==
Like other Swiss German dialects, but unlike modern standard German, Bernese German typically keeps the original grammatical gender distinction in the numerals 'two' (2) and 'three' (3):

- zwe Manne (two men), masculine
- zwo Froue (two women), feminine
- zwöi Ching (two children), neuter

... but only 2 words for "three" (3):

- drei Manne u drei Fraue (three men and three women)
- drü Ching (three children) neuter

== Vocabulary ==
A lot of the vocabulary known as typical to Bernese German comes from the Mattenenglisch, e.g. Gieu 'boy', Modi 'girl'. The best known shibboleths of Bernese German may be the words äuä 'no way' or 'probably', (j)ieu 'yes', geng (or ging, gäng) 'always', Miuchmäuchterli 'Milk can'. Bernese typically say mängisch for the German manchmal (sometimes). An often used word at the end of a sentence is a question tag, "gäu" (2nd person singular) or "gäuet" (2nd person plural, polite form) meaning 'isn't it?', whereas other Swiss German dialects prefer "oder", like 'or what?'.

=== Äuä ===
Äuä (pronounced [ˈæ̞wːæ̞ː], other possible spellings include äuää, äuuä, äuwä, ällwä) is a typical shibboleth of Bernese German. There are two different uses:

- Modal particle: Within a declarative sentence, this word can be used as a German modal particle, connoting that the speaker is only assuming what they are telling, but still quite certain about it. This is very similar to the meaning of the German modal particle wohl. Example:
  - Si chunt äuä gly.
    ‘(I'm quite certain that) she is going to come soon.’
    The modal particle is also used in the following sequences of modal particles: äuä scho, äuä de scho. Both sequences give more emphasis to the certainty of the speaker.
- Pro-sentence: Like many German modal particles, this word can also be used as a pro-sentence (similar to English words like yes or no). Originally, it was used as an affirmative response with similar connotations to the modal particle. However, this meaning is hardly ever used any more. It is almost exclusively used to give a negative answer connoting subjective disbelief. This meaning has developed from an ironic use. Depending on the intonation, the meaning can vary from very strong disbelief to surprised slight disbelief. Examples:
  - Dr Edmund Hillary isch aus Erschte ohni Suurstoff-Fläsche ufe Mount Everest. – Äuä! Der Reinhold Messner isch der Erscht gsy, wo das het gmacht.
    ‘Edmund Hillary was the first to climb Mount Everest without auxiliary oxygen. – No way! Reinhold Messner was the first to do that.’
  - Hesch ghört? AC/DC hei sech ufglöst! – Äuä!?
    ‘Did you hear? AC/DC split up! – No, really?’

Bernese comedian Massimo Rocchi used äuä as the title for one of his shows, which derives much of its comical effect from the bewilderment an outsider experiences (in this case, Italian-born Rocchi) when first confronted with the idiosyncrasies of Bernese German.

== Bernese German literature ==
Although Bernese German is mainly a spoken language (for writing, the standard German language is used), there is a relatively extensive literature which goes back to the beginnings of the 20th century.

Bernese German grammars and dictionaries also exist.

== Bernese German cinema ==
The 2014 film Der Goalie bin ig (English title: I Am the Keeper), whose dialogue is in Bernese German, was a major winner at the 2014 Swiss Film Awards with seven nominations from which it won four trophies including Best Feature Film. The film, directed by Sabine Boss, was adapted from the novel Der Goalie bin ig by Pedro Lenz (which was translated into Glasgow patter by Pedro Lenz and Donal McLaughlin under the title Naw Much of a Talker). The film played at the Locarno Film Festival in August 2014.

In the 2012 Swiss film, More Than Honey, two Swiss beekeepers describe beekeeping techniques between each other about limiting bee swarms in "As we say in Bernese German: No more beekeeping with a ladder on my back".

== Bernese German music ==
Many Bernese German songs have become popular all over the German-speaking part of Switzerland, especially those of Mani Matter. This may have influenced the development of Bernese German rock music, which was the first Swiss German rock music to appear and continues to be one of the most important ones.

Today, notable bands singing in Bernese German include Patent Ochsner, Züri West and Stiller Has.

== Translations ==
- Meyer, Albert. Homer Bärndütsch – Odyssee [Homer in Bernese German - Odyssey]. Muri bei Bern: Edition Francke im Cosmos Verlag. ISBN 3-305-00069-4.
- Gfeller, Walter. Homer Bärndütsch – Ilias [Homer in Bernese German - Iliad]. Bern: A. Francke Verlag.
- Gfeller, Walter. Vergil Bärndütsch – Aeneis [Virgil in Bernese German - Aeneid]. Bern: A. Francke Verlag.
- Bietenhard, Hans and Ruth. Ds Nöie Teschtamänt bärndütsch [The New Testament in Bernese German]. Bern: Berchtold Haller Verlag. ISBN 978-3-85570-086-8.
- Bietenhard, Hans, Ruth and Benedikt. Ds Alte Teschtamänt bärndütsch – en Uswahl [The Old Testament in Bernese German - a selection]. Bern: Berchtold Haller Verlag. ISBN 978-3-85570-107-0.
- Pauli, Lorenz. Der Chly Prinz [The Little Prince]. Bern: Lokwort. ISBN 3-906786-28-5.
- Meli, Dominik (29 December 2021). "Di Göttlechi Komödie. D Höll – Der Lüterigsbärg – Ds Paradys" [The Divine Comedy. Inferno - Purgatory - Paradise]. academia.edu. Bern: Elsa Verlag.

== Bibliography ==
- Otto von Greyerz, Ruth Bietenhard: Berndeutsches Wörterbuch ISBN 3-305-00255-7 Bernese vocabulary
- Werner Marti: Berndeutsch-Grammatik ISBN 3-305-00073-2 Bernese grammar
- Werner Marti: Bärndütschi Schrybwys ISBN 3-305-00074-0 Bernese spelling guide
