= Phonological history of Catalan =

Pronunciation history of the Western Romance language

As a member of the dialect continuum of Romance languages, Catalan (including Valencian) displays linguistic features similar to those of its closest neighbors (Occitan, Aragonese). The following features represent in some cases unique changes in the evolution of Catalan from Vulgar Latin; other features are common in other Romance-speaking areas.

== Phonology ==
Catalan is one of the Western Romance languages; it is most closely related to Occitan and only diverged from it between the eleventh and fourteenth centuries after the cultural ties with France were broken. In time, Catalan became more tied to the Ibero-Romance languages in Spain; because these languages are significantly more conservative than French (which has been the most important influence over Occitan in the last several hundred years), most of the differences between Catalan and Occitan are due to developments in Occitan that did not occur in Catalan.

=== Common features with Western Romance languages ===
As a Western Romance language, Catalan shares the following features not found in Italo-Romance:

- Voicing (and lenition) of intervocalic -p-, -t-, -c- into -b-, -d-, -g- (capra 'goat' > cabra, catēna 'chain' > cadena, secūrvs 'safe' > segur).
- Loss of gemination in stop consonants.
- Development of /ts/ (later /s/) instead of /tʃ/ from palatalized /k/. For example, caelvm ('sky, heaven') > Old Catalan cel /tsɛl/ > modern [ˈsɛl] (cf. Italian cielo /tʃɛlo/).
- Development of c in ct, cs into palatal /j/ (vs. /tt/, /ss, ʃʃ/ in Italian).
- Apico-alveolar pronunciation of /s/ and /z/. (This was once common to all Western Romance languages, but has since disappeared from French, some Occitan dialects, and Portuguese.)

=== Common features with Gallo-Romance languages ===
Innovations:

- Loss of final unstressed vowels except -a (mūrum 'wall' > *muro > mur, flōrem 'flower' >flor); cf. the maintenance of all final vowels except -e after [ɾ, s, ts] in Spanish and Portuguese, e.g. muro but flor; Italo-Romance maintains all final vowels (Italian muro, fiore).
  - The resulting final voiced obstruents undergo devoicing: frigidvs ('cold') > fred [ˈfɾɛt] or [ˈfɾet]. However, final voiceless fricatives are voiced before vowels and voiced consonants (regressive voicing assimilation): els homes 'the men' [əls] + [ˈɔməs] > [əlˈzɔməs]; peix bo 'good fish' [ˈpe(j)ʃ] + [ˈbɔ] > [ˈpe(j)ʒˈβɔ]. (The same final-obstruent devoicing occurs in all of the Western Romance languages to the extent that obstruents become final, but this is fairly rare in Ibero-Romance. Cf. Portuguese luz "light" /lus/ vs. luzes "lights" /ˈluzɨs/, /luzis/, Old Spanish relox "(wrist) watch" /reˈloʃ/ vs. relojes "(wrist) watches" /reˈloʒes/.)
  - Apparent maintenance of -o in first-person singular and -os plurals are likely secondary developments: Old Catalan had no first-person singular -o, and -os plurals occur where they are etymologically unjustified, e.g. peixos "fishes" < piscēs, cf. Portuguese peixes.
- Diphthongization of /ɛ/ and /ɔ/ before palatal consonants (with subsequent loss of middle vowel if a triphthong is produced). Spanish and Portuguese instead raise the vowel to become mid-high; in Spanish, this prevents diphthongization, but diphthongization between palatals does occur in Aragonese. Latin coxa 'thigh' > */kuoiʃa/ > cuixa (cf. French cuisse but Portuguese coxa). Latin octō 'eight' > */uoit/ > vuit (cf. French huit but Portuguese oito, Spanish ocho; Old Occitan both ueit and och). Latin lectum 'bed' > */lieit/ > llit (cf. French lit but Portuguese leito, Spanish lecho; Old Occitan both lieig and leit).

Conserved features:

- Preservation of initial pl-, cl-, fl- (plicāre 'fold' > aplegar 'to reach', clavis 'key' > clau, flamma 'flame' > flama) in contrast to palatalization of these initial clusters in Spanish llegar, llave, llama and Portuguese chegar, chave, chama. In Italo-Romance postconsonantal -l- is generally vocalized to -i- [j], hence Italian piegare, chiave, fiamma.

=== Common features with Occitano-Romance languages ===
Innovations:

- Development of late-final /v/ into /u/ (vocalization): navem 'ship' > nau, brevem 'brief' > breu. Compare Occitan nau, breu; contrast with French nef, bref and Old Spanish non-final nave, breve.
- Loss of word-final -n: panis ('bread') > pa, vinvm ('wine') > vi. (In some Occitan dialects, e.g. Provençal, the consonant was not lost.) Unlike in Languedoc and Northern Catalan, plural forms conserve this [n]: pans, vins.
- Merger of Proto-Western-Romance /ð/ (from intervocalic -d-) and /dz/ (from intervocalic -ty-, -c(e)-, -c(i)-). The result was originally /z/ or /dz/, still preserved in Occitan and partly in Old Catalan, but in modern Catalan now developed to /w/ or lost.

Conserved features:

- Preservation of Vulgar Latin stressed -e- and -o- (short ⟨ĕ⟩ and ⟨ŏ⟩) as [ɛ] and [ɔ] respectively (terra 'land' > terra, mele 'honey' > mel, focum 'fire'> foc [ˈfɔk], bovem 'ox'> bou [ˈbɔw]). These monophthongs were also preserved in Portuguese (terra, mel, fogo, boi). Contrast with the diphthongs in Spanish tierra, miel, fuego, buey. French diphthongizes in open syllables, hence miel, Old French buef (modern bœuf /bœf/), but terre without diphthong. Occitan, but not Catalan, diphthongizes these vowels before velar consonants, i.e. /k/, /ɡ/, /w/: terra, mel, but fuec, bueu.

=== Common features with Spanish, Portuguese, or French but not Occitan ===
- Development of -au-, -ai- to /ɔ, e/ (monophthongization) rather than preservation as /au, ai/ (but Portuguese has /ou, ei/). For example, caulem 'cabbage' > col, paucum 'not much' > poc. (The same development occurred in French.)
- Development of -x- /ks/, -scj- /skj/, -ssj- /ssj/ to [(j)ʃ] (also in Portuguese). Latin coxa 'thigh' > cuixa, Portuguese coxa vs. French cuisse. Latin laxāre 'to loosen' (later 'to let') > Catalan and Portuguese deixar, Old Spanish dexar, but French laisser, Old Occitan laisar. Latin bassiāre 'to lower' > Catalan and Portuguese baixar, Old Spanish baxar, but French baisser. (In Occitan dialects near Catalan and Gascon, there is palatization too: baishar, daishar.)

Conserved features shared by Catalan with Spanish and Portuguese:

- Preservation of Western Romance /u/ and /o/ as [u] and [o]; (other) Gallo-Romance languages have changed these to [y] and [u], respectively. Latin (lūna) 'moon' > lluna [ˈʎunə] or [ˈʎuna/ɛ], Occitan luna [ˈlynɔ], French lune [lyn]. Latin (duplum) 'double' > doble [ˈdobːlə], [ˈdoble] or [ˈdoβle] (also [ˈdopːlə], [ˈdoplə]), Spanish doble [ˈdoβle], Occitan doble [ˈduble], French double [dubl].

Innovations shared by Spanish and Catalan:

- Palatalization of -ll- to [ʎ]: caballum ('horse') > cavall (cf. Spanish caballo with [ʎ] still preserved in conservative rural districts in Spain; Portuguese cavalo, Occitan caval, French cheval, all with simple /l/). In a few cases, /l/ appears as a result of early simplification of -ll- after a long vowel: vīlla 'town' > vila; st(r)ēlla 'star' > Western Catalan estrela, Eastern estrella (cf. Spanish estrella, Portuguese estrela < -ll- but French étoile < -l-).
- Palatalization of -nn- to [ɲ]: annum ('year') > any (cf. Spanish año)
- Reduction of -mb- to m: camba 'leg' > cama, lumbum 'loin' > llom, columbum > colom (cf. Spanish lomo, palumba > paloma but Portuguese lombo, pombo/pomba). Occurs in some Occitan dialects (Gascon and southern Languedoc).

=== Common features with Occitan, French, and Portuguese, but not Spanish ===
- Initial /ɡ/ + yod or /e/ or /i/, /d/ + yod, /j/ > [dʒ]* > [ʒ] or [dʒ] (in contrast to Spanish [ʝ ~ ɟʝ] before stressed non-back vowels)

Conserved features (contrasting with Spanish innovations):

- Intervocalic /l/ + yod (-li-, -le-) and -cl- developed into [ʎ] ll, as in muliere 'wife' > muller, oricla 'ear' > orella, veclu 'old' > vell. Unlike Spanish, Catalan did not undergo the later change of [ʎ] to j (Old Spanish [(d)ʒ], now [x]). In some eastern-central and Balearic varieties, however, the sound developed into [j] through a process known as iodització (not to be confused with 'ieisme'). The development probably involved an intermediate [jl] (formerly written yl: mirayl, current mirall). In most dialects, including Standard Central Catalan, this was later absorbed into [ʎ], while in some varieties, especially Balearic Catalan and certain areas of Girona and Barcelona, it was simplified to [j]. Thus, apicula 'bee' became abella, pronounced [əˈβɛ.ʎə] in Standard Central Catalan but [əˈβɛ.jə] in varieties with iodització. Compare Portuguese mulher, orelha, velho, Occitan molher, French oreille, vieil, in contrast to Spanish mujer, oreja, viejo.
- The cluster -ct- developed only to /(j)t/, as in lactem > *lleit > llet, without the further change to /tʃ/ seen in Spanish and Middle Occitan. The outcome /(j)t/ is found also in Gascon and Languedocian dialects near Catalan, French, and all other Ibero-Romance languages (Portuguese, Leonese, Aragonese). Compare Northern Occitan lait, Occitan near Catalan lèit, French lait, Portuguese leite, in contrast to Southern Occitan lach and Spanish leche.
- The consonant that developed from initial /j/ or /ɡ/ + front vowel is preserved before unstressed non-back vowels in Catalan, as in gelāre ('freeze') > gelar [ʒəˈla] or [dʒeˈla(ɾ)] or iectāre ('lay down') > *gieitar > gitar [ʒiˈta] or [dʒiˈta(ɾ)] , rather than being lost as in Spanish. Compare Portuguese, Occitan gelar in contrast to Spanish helar /eˈlar/ or Portuguese jeitar, Occitan gitar, French jeter in contrast to Spanish echar.
- Initial /f/ remains as such, whereas in Spanish it became /h/ (later lost) before a vowel (i.e. unless preceding /r/, /l/, /w/, /j/). (Gascon actually develops /f/ into /h/ in all circumstances, even before consonants or semi-vowels.)
- Voiced sibilants remain as such, whereas in Spanish they merge into voiceless sibilants.

=== Features not in Spanish or (most of) Occitan, but found in other minority Romance languages ===
- Palatalization of -sc- before -e,i- to [(j)ʃ]. Especially visible in verbs of the third conjugation (-īre) that took what was originally an inchoative infix (-ēsc-/-īsc-), e.g. servēscit 'serves' (present tense, 3rd person singular indicative) > serveix/servix. Found in Aragonese, Leonese and in some Portuguese words. (In Portuguese, piscem 'fish' > peixe, miscere 'to mix' > mexer 'to shake', but most verbs in -scere end in (s)cer, e.g. crēscere 'to grow' > crescer, nascere 'to be born' > nascer, *offerescere 'to offer' > oferecer.)

Innovations:

- Reduction of consonant cluster -nd- to -n- (ambulāre 'to stroll' > andar 'to go' > anar, mandāre 'to send, to lead' > manar). Compare reduction of -mb- to -m-. Also found in Gascon and southern Languedoc.
- Palatalization of initial l- (lūna 'moon' > lluna, lvpvs 'wolf' > llop). This feature can be found as well in the Foix dialect of Occitan and in Astur-Leonese.

=== Unique features, not found elsewhere ===
- Unusual development of early /(d)z/, resulting from merger of Proto-Western-Romance /ð/ (from intervocalic -d-) and /dz/ (from intervocalic -ty-, -c(e)-, -c(i)-); see note above about a similar merger in Occitan. In early Old Catalan, became /w/ finally or before a consonant, remained as /(d)z/ between vowels. In later Old Catalan, /(d)z/ lost between vowels:
  - pedem 'foot' > peu
  - crucem 'cross' > creu, crēdit 'he believes' > (ell) creu
  - Verbs in second-person plural ending in -tis: mirātis 'you (pl.) look' > *miratz > mirau > mireu/mirau
  - ratiōnem 'reason' > razó > raó
  - vicīnum 'neighbor' > vezí > veí
  - recipere 'to receive' > rezebre > reebre > rebre
- Partial reversal of Proto-Western-Romance /e/ and /ɛ/, according to the following stages: Firstly, stressed /e/ became /ə/ in Eastern dialects (Central and Balearic) in most cases. Secondly, stressed /ɛ/ became /e/ in almost all dialects (Central, Balearic, Valencian) in most cases. Third, stressed /ə/ remained unchanged in Balearic Catalan but became /ɛ/ in Central Catalan. For this reason, the word dret ('right') is pronounced [dɾet] in Valencian, [dɾət] in Balearic, and [dɾɛt] in Central Catalan. There are some dialectal exceptions to this evolution. For example, several locations in the Balearic Islands changed /ə/ to /ɛ/, as Central Catalan did. Also, in the western regions of Pallars and Ribagorça, all /ɛ/ were retained without evolving to /e/. In the Algherese dialect, /ə/ evolved to /e/ instead of /ɛ/, and somewhat later than Central Catalan did.
- Secondary development of doubled resonant consonants (/ll/, /mm/, /nn/, /ʎʎ/): septimāna ('week') > setmana [səmˈmanə], cutina from cvtis ('skin') > cotna [ˈkonːə] ('pork rind'), modulum ('mold') > motlle/motle [ˈmɔʎːə]/[ˈmɔlːe] ('mold, a spring'). Later augmented by learned borrowings from Classical Latin (latinisms): athlēta ('athlete') > atleta [əlˈlɛtə], intelligentem ('intelligent') > intel·ligent [intəlːiˈʒen(t)]. Italian has doubled consonants of all sorts, but for the most part these represent direct preservations from Latin rather than secondary developments. Vulgar Latin geminate /ll/, /rr/, /nn/ and sometimes /mm/ develop differently in the various Western Romance languages from the corresponding single consonants, but in divergent ways, indicating that the geminate forms must have been preserved in the early medieval forms of these languages even after geminate obstruents were lost. Some dialects of Aragonese (a sister language to Catalan) still preserve /ll/ as the reflex of Latin /ll/. Catalan modern geminate resonants do not descend from these early medieval geminates (/ll/, /mm/, /nn/ > /ʎ/, /m/, /ɲ/), but the development of secondary geminate resonants may have been influenced by nearby dialects that still maintained the original geminates or by other secondary geminates that must have existed at one point (e.g. duodecim > proto-Western-Romance /doddze/, where the outcome of resulting /ddz/ is distinguished from single /dz/ in Catalan, Occitan and French and where the French outcome douze, with no diphthongization, clearly indicates a geminate consonant).

== Historical development ==
As a Romance language, Catalan comes directly from Vulgar Latin. As such, it shares certain phonological changes from Latin with other Romance languages:

=== Consonants ===
- Intervocalic consonant lenition, similar to most of Western Romance languages:
  - Intervocalic sounds were often voiced (circa fifth century AD).
  - /b/ and /w/ between vowels became [v]. E.g. caballu > cavall "horse" (this later evolved to [β] in central, northern, and northwestern dialects).
  - /d/ became [ð] between vowels in Iberia, Gaul, Raetia, northern Italy, and a part of Sardinia.
  - Intervocalic pretonic /ɡ/ was deleted in most words.
  - In some cases other voiced stops were lost as well. E.g. volebat > volia "s/he wanted", pavore > pahor > por "awe".
  - Geminate voiceless stops are simplified. E. g. bucca > boca "mouth", passare > passar [pəˈsa] ~ [paˈsar] "pass".
- The velars /k/ and /ɡ/ became palatalized before front vowels.
  - by the fourth century, palatalized /ɡ/ had become a palatal approximant /j/. When following a vowel and preceding a stressed vowel, this approximant became fused with the following front vowel: /maˈɡister/ > [maˈjɪster] > [maˈester] > [ˈmastiɾ]. In the Iberian peninsula, southwestern Gaul, and portions of Sardinia, Sicily, and southwestern Italy, this palatal approximant stage was retained while other dialects made different developments.
  - Palatalized /k/, which had developed a palatal offglide (i.e. [kʲj], continued to advance further forward in the mouth to become [tʲj] (which led to some confusion between /kj/ and /tj/). By the sixth or seventh century, this palatalized coronal had become an affricate ([tsʲ] or [ts]).
  - /sk/ was also part of this palatalization.
- Before or after another consonant /l/ was velarized (leading to l-vocalization in some dialects). After consonants, this may have led to the realization of a palatal lateral in Spanish and Italian.
- /kʷ/ became /k/ before /u/ and /o/ by the first century.
- /h/ was deleted, first when medial and then in all contexts soon after.
- /n/ became silent word-finally; nasalization on vowels (represented by m word-finally and n before /s/ and /f/) is also lost.
- /ks/ was reduced to /s/ before or after another consonant. By analogy, the prefix ex- before vowels may have also been pronounced /es/. Later on, /ks/ was also reduced word-finally except in monosyllabic words.
- /sj/, /lj/ and /nj/ became palatal between vowels.
- /ss/ after diphthongs and long vowels reduced to /s/ (degeminated): /kaːssus/ > /kaːsus/. There was just general confusion in regards to geminated consonants but they were normally retained after long vowels.
- /n/, followed by a fricative (/f/, /ʒ/, /s/, or /v/), was deleted and replaced by the lengthening of the previous vowel: /kensor/ > /tʃeːsor/.
- Loss of final -n after the demise of final unstressed vowels, e. g. manu > man > mà "hand".
- Unlike Spanish and other Iberian Romance languages, betacism or loss of b/v distinction seems to be in Catalan an innovation since the modern era.
- Like Asturian, palatalization of Latin word initial l-; e.g. luna > lluna "moon"; lupu > llop "wolf", with evidence for it by the ninth century.
- Vocalization to [w] of final -d of diverse origins and the Latin verbal ending -tis: pede > peu [pɛw] "foot"; credit > creu [ˈkɾɛw] "he believes"; miratis > miratz > mirau > mireu [miˈɾɛw] "you watch".

=== Vowels ===
- Eventually (in Iberia and parts of Gaul), all stressed vowels were pronounced long while unstressed vowels were short. The new long vowels were pronounced in most regions with diphthongization although Portugal, southern Gaul, Lombardy, and Sicily did not participate in this early breaking. The vowels most affected were /ɛː/ and /ɔː/.
- Vowels were often syncopated.
  - Between a labial and another consonant.
    - When such a deletion brought [aβ] to precede another consonant, it became [au].
  - Between a consonant and a liquid or vice versa.
- In Eastern dialects, earlier close-mid /e/ became [ə] in most cases, and later became open /ɛ/ in Central Catalan. In both Western and Eastern dialects, earlier /ɛ/ became /e/ in most contexts (but not all; see below) so the final outcome of Latin short and long e is reversed in relation to other Romance languages.
- Unlike Occitan and other Gallo-Romance languages, Catalan preserves the three degrees for rounded back vowels /ɔ o u/, and /u/ is not fronted to /y/.
- Short /i/ and /u/ became [e] and [o], probably by the first century AD. Also, vowel quantity between short mid-vowels and long mid-vowels became differentiated: /deus/ > [dɛus].
- Like Occitan, loss of Latin final unstressed vowels, except -a; and then after some of the resulting consonantic groups a support vowel -e (pronounced [e] or [ə]) appears, e. g. fame > fam "hunger"; bucca > boca "mouth"; nostru > nostre "ours".
- Stressed /e/ and /i/, when immediately followed by a vowel of the penultimate syllable, became /j/; /u/ in the same environment became /w/.

==== Cases where /ɛ/ and /ɔ/ were retained in modern Catalan and Valencian ====
The following tables show where /ɛ/ and /ɔ/ were retained in Valencian (as well as other Catalan dialects):

/ɛ/
Context		Examples	Remarks
In words that have an i or a u in the following syllable		coŀlegi, exèrcit, èxit, incendi, inèdit, neci, obsequi, misteri, ciència, innocència, paciència; cèŀlula, fècula, ingenu, molècula, perpetu, pèrdua	but not in Dénia, església, sépia, séquia, sénia
Before	simple or geminated l	arrel, cel, gel, melsa, tela; ceŀla, noveŀla	but not in belga, feltre, delta, selva
Before	rr	esquerra, ferro, gerra, guerra, serra, terra	
Before	r followed by consonants, except labials and velars	cert, gerd, perdre, perla, hivern, verd, vèrtex, dispers, perxa	
In the majority of proparoxytones and learned terms		anècdota, clavicèmbal, elèctrode, espècimen, èxtasi, gènesi, gènere; acèfal, pètal, telègraf, verb	but not in llémena, témpores, nor the feminines cérvola, feréstega, llépola; also not in learned words ending in -edre, -ense, -teca and -tema: poliedre, castrense, biblioteca, teorema
In some words with the diphthong eu		deu, fideu, peu, preu, museu	but not in creu, greu, meu
In words ending in -ecta, -ecte -epta and -epte		coŀlecta, correcte, efecte, respecte; recepta, concepte, excepte, precepte	but not in the stressed forms of the verb reptar
In some words with the group -ndr-		cendra, divendres, gendre, tendre	
Others		the proper names Josep, Vicent, Benimuslem or the numeral set	
/ɔ/
Context		Examples	Remarks
In words that have an i or a u in the following syllable (generally cultivated terms)		Antoni, bibliòfil, custòdia, elogi, lògica; còmput, cònjuge, Corpus, mòdul	but not in fórmula
When forms a falling diphthong		Alcoi, boira, heroi; bou, dijous, nou, ou, prou, sou (n.); in the forms with the accent in the radical of verbs cloure, coure, moure, ploure	but not in the verbal forms sou, fou, and words like coix, moix, jou, pou (*), tou
In the majority of proparoxytone words and learned terms		còmode, nòmada, òrfena, pròrroga, anòmal, autònom, hidrogen, pròleg	but not in pólvora, tómbola, tórtora, estómac, furóncol; dogma, forma
In the neutral pronouns and monosyllabic ending in -o		açò, això and allò; bo, do, pro, so, to, tro	but not in no, brot and, with variations between dialects, in jo
In some words ending in -os and -osa		arròs, cos, espòs, gros, mos, os, repòs, terròs, tros; cosa, nosa, rosa	but not in animós, enfadós, poregós, glucosa, rabosa, prosa
In some words in which the vowel is followed of a consonantic group with r or l		amorf, cobra, corda, força, forja, orfe, mort, port, porta, moble, poble, record, the forms with the accent in the radical of verbs like obrir (obri), omplir (ompli), dormir (dorm), etc.	
In words ending in:	-oc, -oca	albercoc, foc, groc, lloca, oca, roca, xoc	but not in boc, boca, moca
In words ending in:	-ofa	carxofa, estrofa	
In words ending in:	-oig, -oja	boig, roig, boja, roja	but not in estoig
In words ending in:	-ol, -ola	bunyol, consol, dol, escola, pistola, cassola, escarola, sola, vol	but not in gola, bola, cola
In words ending in:	-oldre	absoldre, moldre, resoldre	
In words ending in:	-olt, -olta	desimbolt, solt, mòlta, volta	but not in molta, escolta, cola
In words ending in:	-pondre	pondre, compondre, correspondre, respondre	
In words ending in:	-ort, -orta	esport, fort, sort, tort, horta, porta	
In words ending in:	-ossa	brossa, carrossa, crossa, destrossa	but not in bossa, gossa, ossa, rossa
In words ending in:	-ost, -osta	cost, impost, pressupost, rebost, costa, posta	but not in agost, angost, congost, most, llagosta
In words ending in:	-ot, -ota	clot, dot, got, ninot, cabota, granota, nota, pilota, pota	but not in bot, brot, gota, mot, nebot, tot
In other terms, many of which are monosyllabic or have the stress on the first syllable		cor, dona, flor, nota, prova, plor, rosa, roda, or in forms with the accent in the radical of verbs like constar (consta), llogar (lloga), robar (roba), tocar (toca), trobar (troba), volar (vola), etc.	

(*) Words with this symbol accept two pronunciations (open and close).

==== Cases where /ə/ developed in Balearic Catalan ====
This table shows where /ə/ (mostly corresponding with /ɛ/ in Central Catalan and /e/ in Western Catalan–Valencian) is found in Balearic:

/ə/ (mostly /ɛ/ in Central Catalan and /e/ in Western Catalan–Valencian)
Context		Examples	Remarks
In some monosyllabic terms	fe, ble, què	but not in te (n.), uè	
Derivatives with the suffix	-è	mercè, vostè	but not in cafè, oboè, tupè
Derivatives with the suffix	-e / -è (etymologically with nasal, kept only in feminines and plurals)	ple, fre; alè, desè, dotzè, centè, cinquè, morè	but not in aŀlè, heŀlè, obscè
Derivatives with the suffix	-ec	bec, crec, frec, sec (adj.)	but not in cec, sec, xec
Derivatives with the suffix	-ed	fred, calfred, refred	
Derivatives with the suffix	-ei	beneit, maleit, remei, servei	but not in hoquei, jersei
Derivatives with the suffix	-èixer	conèixer, florèixer, merèixer, parèixer	but not in néixer
Derivatives with the suffix	-ell, -ella	aquell, cabell, consell, rovell, solell, vermell; abella, parella, orella, ovella	but not in ell, ella, bell, castell, manell, martell, nivell, novell, ocell, pell, vell, etc.
Derivatives with the suffix	-èn (or en)	aprèn, comprèn, mossèn, ofrèn; pren	but not in gen, tren
Derivatives with the suffix	-ena	arena, balena, bena, cadena, mena, pena, vena	but not in avena, berena
Derivatives with the suffix	-enc, -enca	abrilenc, blavenc, estatunidenc, salvadorenc, solsonenc	
Derivatives with the suffix	-ènyer	atènyer, constrènyer, destrènyer, empènyer, espènyer, estrènyer, restrènyer	
Derivatives with the suffix	-er, -era	plaer, parer, poder, sencer, voler; cera, pera	but not in brasiler, oliver, vesper, figuera, tetera
Derivatives with the suffix	-ès, -esa	francès, interès, pagès, Vallès; bellesa, promesa, riquesa	but not in accés, excés, congrés, ingrés, progrés, revés, través, només
Derivatives with the suffix	-et, -eta	coet, casquet, disquet, dret, net; camiseta, aixeta	but not in atleta, meta, seta
in the verbal forms of -ejar with an accent on the radical		airejar (aireig), marejar (mareig), verdejar (verdeig)	

== Bibliography ==
- Grandgent, Charles Hall (1907), "Phonology", An Introduction to Vulgar Latin, D.C. Heath & Co., pp. 60–143, ISBN 978-1-4021-6201-5
- Badia i Margarit, Antoni Maria (1964), El català, entre la Gal·loromània i la Iberoromània, Llengua i cultura als Països Catalans, Barcelona: Grup 62
- Colón, Germà (1993), El lèxic català dins la Romània, Biblioteca Lingüística Catalana, Valencia: Universitat de València, ISBN 84-370-1327-5
- Lacreu Cuesta, Josep (2002), Manual d'ús de l'estàndard oral (6th ed.), Valencia: Universitat de València, ISBN 978-84-370-5390-5
