= Kashubian language =

West Slavic language

Kashubian
- kaszëbsczi (jãzëk) kaszëbskô mòwa
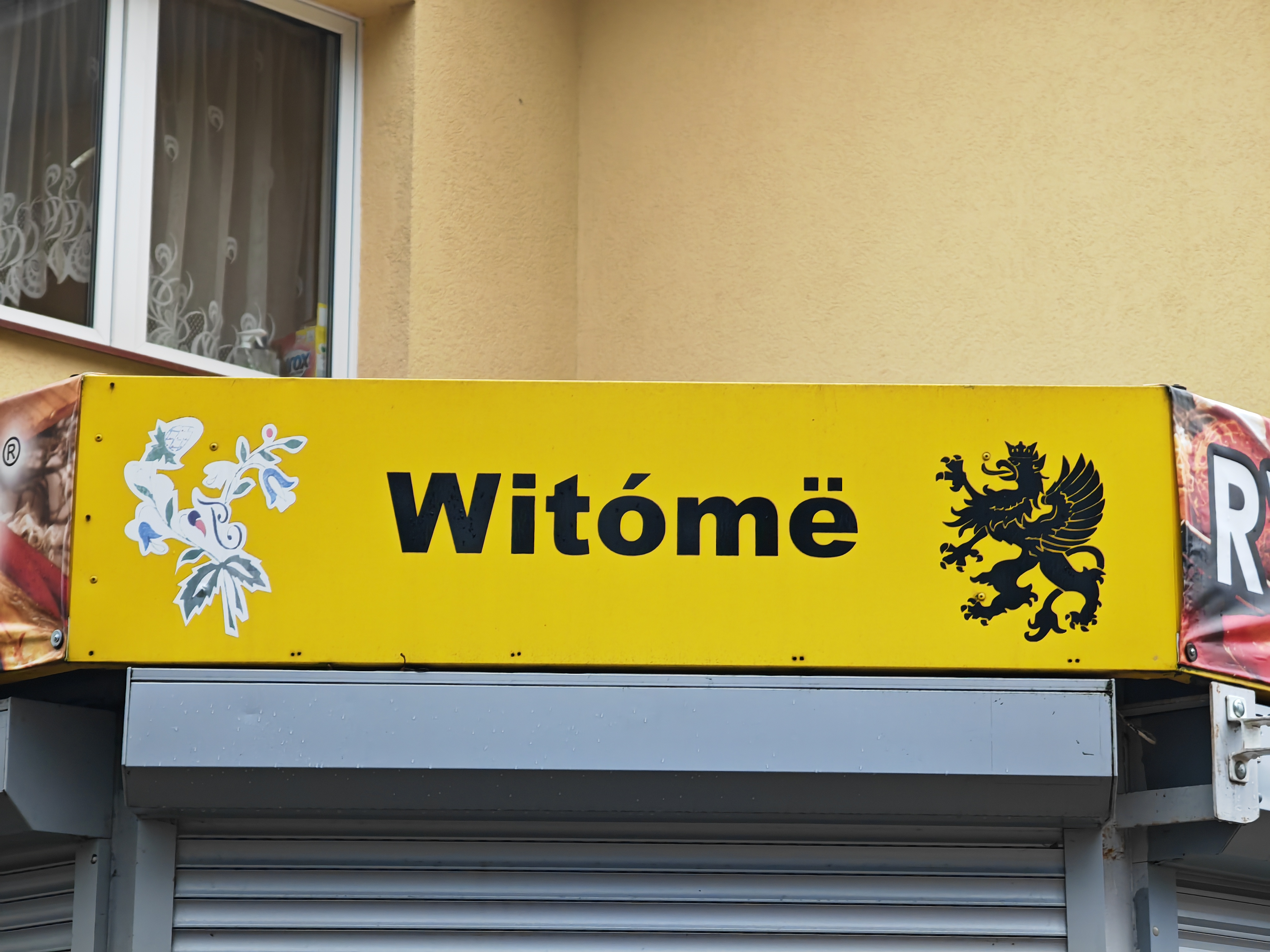
- A sign saying witómë (welcome) in Kashubian in Wiôlgô Wies (Władysławowo), 2024
- Pronunciation: [kaˈʃɜpst͡ʃi ˈjãzɜk] [kaˈʃɜpskɞ ˈmwɛva]
- Native to: Poland
- Region: Kashubia
- Ethnicity: Kashubians
- Native speakers: 87,600 (2021 census)
- Language family: Indo-European: Balto-Slavic; Slavic; West Slavic; Lechitic; Pomeranian; Kashubian
- Writing system: Latin (Kashubian alphabet)

Official status
- Official language in: Officially recognized as of 2005, as a regional language, in some communes of Pomeranian Voivodeship, Poland
- Recognised minority language in: Poland

Language codes
- ISO 639-2: csb
- ISO 639-3: csb
- Glottolog: kash1274
- ELP: Kashubian
- Linguasphere: 53-AAA-cb
- Kashubian is classified as Definitely Endangered by the UNESCO Atlas of the World's Languages in Danger (2010)

Kashubian (/kəˈʃuːbiən/) or Cassubian (/kəˈsuːbiən/; endonym: kaszëbsczi jãzëk; Polish: język kaszubski) is a West Slavic language belonging to the Lechitic subgroup.

Approximately 87,600 people use mainly Kashubian at home. It is close to standard Polish with influence from Low German and the extinct Polabian (West Slavic) and Old Prussian (West Baltic) languages, and is the only remnant of the Pomeranian language.

The Kashubian language exists in two different forms: vernacular dialects used in rural areas, and literary variants used in education.

== Origin ==
Linguistic map of Kashubia and neighboring regions in the year 1910

The oldest documented Kashubian records date back to c. 1402, with Polish-language containing borrowed Kashubian words and expressions (pl:Kashubianisms).

Kashubian is assumed to have evolved from the language spoken by some tribes of Pomeranians called Kashubians, in the region of Pomerania, on the southern coast of the Baltic Sea between the Vistula and Oder rivers. It first began to evolve separately in the period from the 13th to the 15th century as the Polish-Pomeranian linguistic area began to divide based around important linguistic developments centered in the western (Kashubian) part of the area.

In the 19th century Florian Ceynowa became Kashubian's first known activist. He undertook tremendous efforts to awaken Kashubian self-identity through the establishment of Kashubian language, customs, and traditions. He felt strongly that Poles were born brothers and that Kashubia was a separate nation.

The Young Kashubian movement followed in 1912, led by author and doctor Aleksander Majkowski, who wrote for the paper Zrzësz Kaszëbskô as part of the Zrzëszincë group. The group contributed significantly to the development of the Kashubian literary language.

The earliest Kashubian prints are from the end of the 16th century. The modern orthography was first proposed in 1879.

=== Related languages ===
Many scholars and linguists debate whether Kashubian should be recognized as a Polish dialect or separate language. In terms of historical development, it is a separate Lechitic West Slavic language, but, in terms of modern influence, Polish is a prestige language. Kashubian is closely related to Slovincian, and both of them are dialects of Pomeranian. Despite this, some linguists, in Poland and elsewhere, consider it a dialect, or ethnolect, of Polish. Dialectal diversity is so great within Kashubian that a speaker of southern dialects has considerable difficulty in understanding a speaker of northern dialects.

The spelling and the grammar of Polish words, which is most of Kashubian vocabulary, are very different from the original, making it difficult for native Polish speakers to comprehend written text in Kashubian. Like in Polish, about 5% of loanwords in Kashubian are from High German and Low German (such as kùńszt "art"); unlike in Polish, these are mostly from Low German and only occasionally from High German. Other sources of loanwords include the Baltic languages.

== Speakers ==
=== Poland ===
The number of speakers of Kashubian varies widely from source to source. In the 2021 census, approximately 87,600 people in Poland declared that they used Kashubian at home, a decrease from over 108,000 in the 2011 census. Of these, only 1,700 reported speaking exclusively in Kashubian within their homes, down from 3,800 in 2011. However, experts caution that changes in census methodology and the socio-political climate may have influenced these results. The number of people who can speak at least some Kashubian is higher, around 366,000. All Kashubian speakers are also fluent in Polish. A number of schools in Poland use Kashubian as a teaching language. It is an official alternative language for local administration purposes in Gmina Sierakowice, Gmina Linia, Gmina Parchowo, Gmina Luzino and Gmina Żukowo in the Pomeranian Voivodeship. Most respondents say that Kashubian is used in informal speech among family members and friends. This is most likely because Polish is the official language and spoken in formal settings.

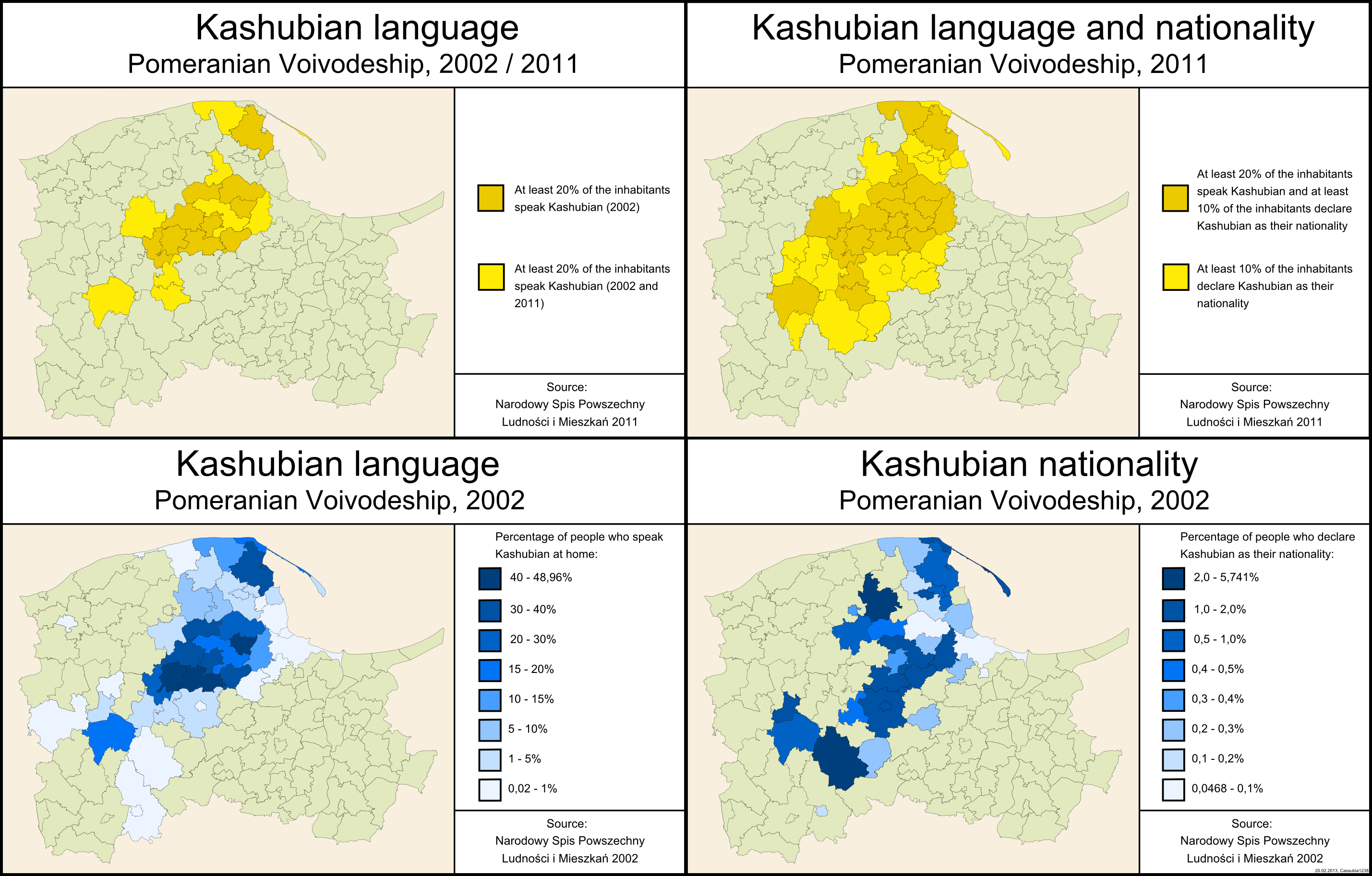
Kashubian language Pomeranian Voivodeship, Poland (2011 census)

=== Americas ===
During the Kashubian diaspora of 1855–1900, 115,700 Kashubians emigrated to North America, with around 15,000 emigrating to Brazil. Among the Polish community of Renfrew County, Ontario, Kashubian is widely spoken to this day, despite the use of more formal Polish by parish priests. In Winona, Minnesota, which Ramułt termed the "Kashubian Capital of America", Kashubian was regarded as "poor Polish", as opposed to the "good Polish" of the parish priests and teaching sisters. Consequently, Kashubian failed to survive Polonization and died out shortly after the mid-20th century.

== Literature ==
Important for Kashubian literature was Xążeczka dlo Kaszebov by Florian Ceynowa (1817–1881). Hieronim Derdowski (1852–1902 in Winona, Minnesota) was another significant author who wrote in Kashubian, as was Aleksander Majkowski (1876–1938) from Kościerzyna, who wrote the Kashubian national epic The Life and Adventures of Remus. Jan Trepczyk was a poet who wrote in Kashubian, as was Stanisław Pestka. Kashubian literature has been translated into Czech, Polish, English, German, Belarusian, Slovene and Finnish. Aleksander Majkowski and Alojzy Nagel belong to the most commonly translated Kashubian authors of the 20th century. A considerable body of Christian literature has been translated into Kashubian, including the New Testament, much of it by Adam Ryszard Sikora (OFM). Franciszek Grucza graduated from a Catholic seminary in Pelplin. He was the first priest to introduce Catholic liturgy in Kashubian.

=== Works ===
The earliest recorded artifacts of Kashubian date back to the 15th century and include a book of spiritual psalms that were used to introduce Kashubian to the Lutheran church:

- 1586 Duchowne piesnie (Spiritual songs) D. Marcina Luthera y ynßich naboznich męzow. Zniemieckiego w Slawięsky ięzik wilozone Przes Szymana Krofea... w Gdainsku: przes Jacuba Rhode, Tetzner 1896: translated from pastorks. S. Krofeja, Słowińca (?) rodem z Dąbia.
- 1643 Mały Catechism (Little Catechism) D. Marciná Lutherá Niemiecko-Wándalski ábo Slowięski to jestá z Niemieckiego języká w Słowięski wystáwiony na jáwnosc wydan..., w Gdaińsku przes Jerzego Rhetá, Gdansk 1643. Pastor smołdziński ks. Mostnik, rodem ze Slupska.
- Perykopy smołdzinskie (Smoldzinski Pericope), published by Friedhelm Hinze, Berlin (East), 1967
- Śpiewnik starokaszubski (Old Kashubian songbook), published by Friedhelm Hinze, Berlin (East), 1967

== Education ==
Throughout the communist period in Poland (1948–1989), Kashubian greatly suffered in education and social status. Kashubian was represented as folklore and prevented from being taught in schools. Following the collapse of communism, attitudes on the status of Kashubian have been gradually changing. It has been included in the program of school education in Kashubia although not as a language of teaching or as a required subject for every child, but as a foreign language taught 3 hours per week at parents' explicit request. Since 1991, it is estimated that there have been around 17,000 students in over 400 schools who have learned Kashubian. Kashubian has some limited usage on public radio and had on public television.

Since 2005, Kashubian has enjoyed legal protection in Poland as an official regional language. It is the only language in Poland with that status, which was granted by the Act of 6 January 2005 on National and Ethnic Minorities and on the Regional Language of the Polish Parliament. The act provides for its use in official contexts in ten communes in which speakers are at least 20% of the population. The recognition means that heavily populated Kashubian localities have been able to have road signs and other amenities with Polish and Kashubian translations on them.

== Dialects ==
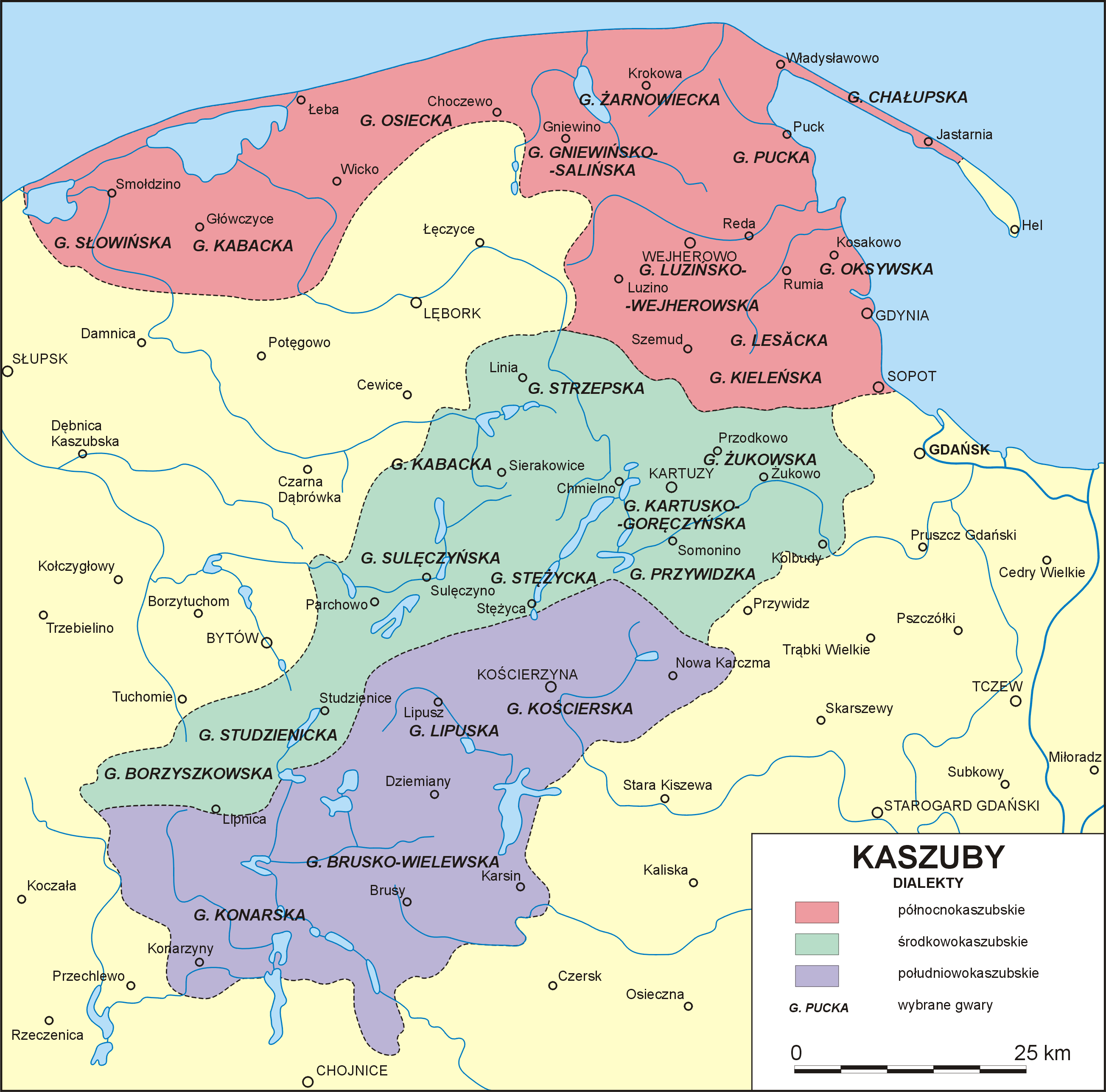
Kashubian dialects area in the early 20th century

Friedrich Lorentz wrote in the early 20th century that there were three main Kashubian dialects. These include the

- Northern Kashubian dialect
- Central Kashubian dialect
- Southern Kashubian dialect

Other researches would argue that each tiny region of the Kaszuby has its own dialect, as in Dialects and Slang of Poland:

- Bylacki dialect
- pl:Slowinski dialect
- Kabatkow dialect
- pl:Zaborski dialect
- Tucholski and Krajniacki dialect (although both dialects would be considered a transitional form of the Wielkopolski dialect and are included as official Wielkopolskie dialects)

== Phonology ==
The phonological system of the Kashubian language is similar in many ways to those of other Slavic languages. The Kashubization of consonants is a distinguishing feature of Pomeranian dialects. Kashubian has a large vowel inventory, with 9 oral vowels and 2 nasal vowels.

=== Vowel length ===
Friedrich Lorentz argued that northern dialects had contrastive vowel length, but later studies showed that any phonemic length distinctions had disappeared by 1900. Any other vowel length is used for expressive purposes or is the result of syllable stress. All traces of vowel length can now be seen in vowel alterations.

=== Syllable stress ===
Kashubian features free placement of stress, and in some cases, mobile stress, and in northern dialects, unstressed syllables can result in vowel reduction. An archaic word final stress is preserved in some two-syllable adjectives, adverbs, and regularly in the comparative degree of adverbs, in some infinitives and present and past tense forms, some nouns ending in -ô, in diminutives. ending in -ik/-yk, nouns formed with -c and -k, and some prepositional phrases with pronouns.

Stress mobility can be observed in nouns, where in the singular the stress is initial, but in the plural it's on the final syllable of the stem, i.e. k'òlano but kòl'anami, and in some verb forms, i.e. k'ùpi vs kùp'ita. Some dialects have merged ë with e, making the distinction contrastive. Most of this mobility is limited to morphology and stress has largely stabilized in Kashubian.

Northern and central dialects show a much more limited mobility, as northern dialects show stabilization on initial stress, and central shows constant distance between the stressed syllable and the initial syllable of the word. Proclitics such as prepositions, pronouns, and grammatical particles such as nié may take initial stress.

Eastern groups place accents on the penultimate syllable.

The difference between southern and northern dialects dates as far back as the 14th–15th century and is the result of changes to the Proto-Slavic vowel length system.

=== Phonological processes from Proto-Slavic ===
1. Retention of softness before -ar-: Kashubian czwiôrtk vs Polish czwartek
2. Proto-Slavic *-ъl-/*-ьl- -> -ôł-: Kashubian kôłbasa vs Polish kiełbasa
  1. This change is somewhat archaic or lexicalized, appearing more in the North.
3. TelT -> TłoT: Kashubian młoc vs Polish mleć
4. Retention of TarT, especially in the North: Kashubian bardówka vs Polish brodawka
  1. This feature is not regular and is somewhat archaic, even giving rise to archaizing neologisms such as Kashubian barń (from Kashubian bróń).
5. Labialization of initial o-: Kashubian òwca vs Polish owca
6. So-called Kashubization, Proto-Slavic soft t/d/s/z initially to t͡ɕ, d͡ʑ, ɕ, ʑ and finally to t͡s, d͡z, s, z: Kashubian cëchò vs Polish cicho, Kashubian chòdzëc vs Polish chodzić, Kashubian swiat vs Polish świat, Kashubian zëma vs Polish zima
  1. This process occurred differently in the West, where soft ć/dź went to t/d
7. Initial ra- -> re- and ja- -> je-, however modern forms usually retain -a- Kashubian redło vs Polish radło, Kashubian jerzmò vs Polish jarzmo
8. Irregular change of -ar- -> -er-, Kashubian żerlë alongside Kashubian żarła (from Kashubian żréc), vs Polish żarła (from Polish żreć).
9. Regional retention of medial -t- in the word Kashubian sétmë ("seven") vs Polish siedem (compare Masurian Polish sziétém).
10. Loss of mobile e through analysis of declined forms: Kashubian dómk (genitive singular Kashubian dómkù) vs Polish domek (genitive singular Polish domku, Kashubian matk (genitive plural of Kashubian matka) vs Polish matek (genitive plural of Polish matka)
11. An ablaut of e:'o after a soft consonant but before hard dentals: Kashubian wiezc (first person present singular Kashubian wiozã) vs Polish wieźć (first person present singular Polish wiozę).
  1. This ablaut may occur also through analogy, i.e. Kashubian wiozlë (past virile l form of Kashubian wiezc), vs Polish wieźli.
12. Proto-Slavic ř -> rz r̝: Kashubian mòrze vs Polish morze (where rz in Polish is pronounced as a fricative ʐ)
13. -dz- -> -z-: Kashubian cëzy vs Polish cudzy
  1. This feature is chiefly Northern, and often forms with -dz- dominate.
14. Lengthening (now a qualitative change) vowels of word-final closed syllables ending with an etymologically voiced consonant: Kashubian bóg (genitive singular Kashubian boga vs Polish bóg (genitive singular Polish boga, Kashubian miała but Kashubian miôł (past feminine and masculine l-forms of Kashubian miec) vs Polish miała/Polish miał, Kashubian pana (genitive singular of Kashubian pón) vs Polish pana/Polish pan, Kashubian gniewu (genitive singular of Kashubian gniéw) vs Polish gniewu (genitive singular of Polish gniew), Kashubian dëmù (genitive singular of Kashubian dim) vs Polish dymu (genitive singular of Polish dym), Kashubian cëdu (genitive singular of Kashubian cud) vs Polish cudu (genitive singular of Polish cud). Compare Old Polish phonology.
15. Proto-Slavic *ę -> Early Kashubian į -> i: Kashubian wzyc vs Polish wziąć
  1. This change was also effected by the change causing i:ë ablaut
16. As a result of Kaszëbienié, short i -> ë after s, z, c, dz: Kashubian cëchò, chòdzëc, sëwi, zëma vs Polish cicho, chodzić, siwy, zima
17. Short y/i after hard consonants -> ë: Kashubian bëc, lëpa, przësc vs Polish być, lipa, prząść
18. Soft k/g -> cz/dż or sometimes ć/dź: Kashubian czedë vs Polish kiedy, Kashubian nodżi (genitive singular or nominative/accusative plural of Kashubian noga) vs Polish nogi (genitive singular or nominative/accusative plural of Polish noga)
19. Bëlaczenié in northern dialects, i.e. ł -> l: Kashubian jaskùlëczka vs Polish jaskółeczka
20. Hardening of ń -> n is southern Kashubian: Kashubian kónsczi (usually Kashubian kóńsczi) vs Polish koński
21. Dissimilation of some consonant cluster such as kt -> cht or srz/zrz -> strz/zdrz: Kashubian chto vs Polish kto and Kashubian strzoda, zdrzódło vs Polish środa, źródło.
22. Reduction of some consonant clusters, especially in frequent words: Kashubian pierszi, baro vs Polish pierwszy, bardzo
23. Prothesis, particularly the insertion of j- before word initial i-: Kashubian jistniec vs Polish istnieć
  1. Regional insertion of h- before word initial a-: Kashubian (h)arfa vs Polish arfa

=== Vowels ===
Kashubian vowel phonemes
	Front	Central		Back
	unrounded		rounded	
Close	i			u
Close-mid	e	ə		o
Open-mid	ɛ	ə	ɞ	ɔ
Open		a		

- The exact phonetic realization of the close-mid vowels /e, o/ depends on the dialect.
- Apart from these, there are also nasal vowels /ã, õ/. Their exact phonetic realization depends on the dialect.
- /ɔ, u/ diphthongize to /wɛ/, /wu/ after p, b, k, g, and ch.

=== Consonants ===
Kashubian has simple consonants with a secondary articulation along with complex ones with secondary articulation.

Kashubian consonant phonemes
		Labial	Dental	Alveolar	Palatal	Velar
Nasal		m	n		ɲ	
Plosive	voiceless	p	t			k
Plosive	voiced	b	d			ɡ
Affricate	voiceless		ts	tʃ	(tɕ)	
Affricate	voiced		dz	dʒ	(dʑ)	
Fricative	voiceless	f	s	ʃ	(ɕ)	x
Fricative	voiced	v	z	ʒ	(ʑ)	
Fricative	trill			(r̝)		
Approximant				l	j	w
Trill				r		

- /tʃ, dʒ, ʃ, ʒ/ are palato-alveolar.
- /ɲ, tɕ, dʑ, ɕ, ʑ/ are alveolo-palatal; the last four appear only in some dialects.
- The fricative trill /r̝/ is now used only by some northern and northeastern speakers; other speakers realize it as flat postalveolar [ʐ].
- The labialized velar central approximant /w/ is realized as a velarized denti-alveolar lateral approximant [ɫ̪] by older speakers of southeastern dialects.

=== Voicing and devoicing ===
Kashubian features the same system of voicing assimilation as standard Polish.

=== Vocabulary ===
German has been the source for most loanwords in Kashubian, with an estimated 5% of the vocabulary, as opposed to 3% in Polish.

Kashubian, like other Slavic languages, has a rich system of derivational morphology, with prefixes, suffixes, deverbals, compounds, among others.

== Orthography ==
=== Kashubian alphabet ===
Upper case	Lower case	Name of letters	Pronunciation
A	a	a	[a]
Ą	ą	ą	[õ], [ũ]
Ã	ã	ã	[ã], [ɛ̃] (Puck County, Wejherowo County)
B	b	bé	[b]
C	c	cé	[ts]
D	d	dé	[d]
E	e	e	[ɛ]
É	é	é	[e], [ɨj] in some dialects, [ɨ] at the end of a word, [i]/[ɨ] from Puck to Kartuzy
Ë	ë	szwa	[ə]
F	f	éf	[f]
G	g	gé	[ɡ]
H	h	ha	[x]
I	I	i	[i]
J	j	jot	[j]
K	k	ka	[k]
L	l	él	[l]
Ł	ł	éł	[w], [l]
M	m	ém	[m]
N	n	én	[n]
Ń	ń	éń	[ɲ], [n]
O	o	o	[ɔ]
Ò	ò	ò	[wɛ]
Ó	ó	ó	[o], [u] (southern dialects)
Ô	ô	ô	[ɞ], [ɛ] (western dialects), [ɔ] (Wejherowo County), [o]/[u] (southern dialects) [œ], [ø] (northern dialects)
P	p	pé	[p]
R	r	ér	[r]
S	s	és	[s]
T	t	té	[t]
U	u	u	[u]
Ù	ù	ù	[wʉ]
W	w	wé	[v]
Y	y	igrek	[i]
Z	z	zet	[z]
Ż	ż	żet	[ʒ], [ʑ]

The following digraphs are also used:

Digraph	Phonemic value(s)
ch	/x/
cz	/tʃ/, /tɕ/
dz	/dz/ (/ts/)
dż	/dʒ/, /dʑ/ (/tʃ/, /tɕ/)
rz	/ʐ/ ~ /r̝/ (/ʂ/)
sz	/ʃ/, /ɕ/

== Sample text ==
Article 1 of the Universal Declaration of Human Rights in Kashubian:

Wszëtczi lëdze rodzą sã wòlny ë równy w swòji czëstnoce ë swòjich prawach. Mają òni dostóne rozëm ë sëmienié ë nôlégô jima pòstãpòwac wobec drëdzich w dëchù bracënotë.

Article 1 of the Universal Declaration of Human Rights in English:

All human beings are born free and equal in dignity and rights. They are endowed with reason and conscience and should act towards one another in a spirit of brotherhood.

== Gallery ==
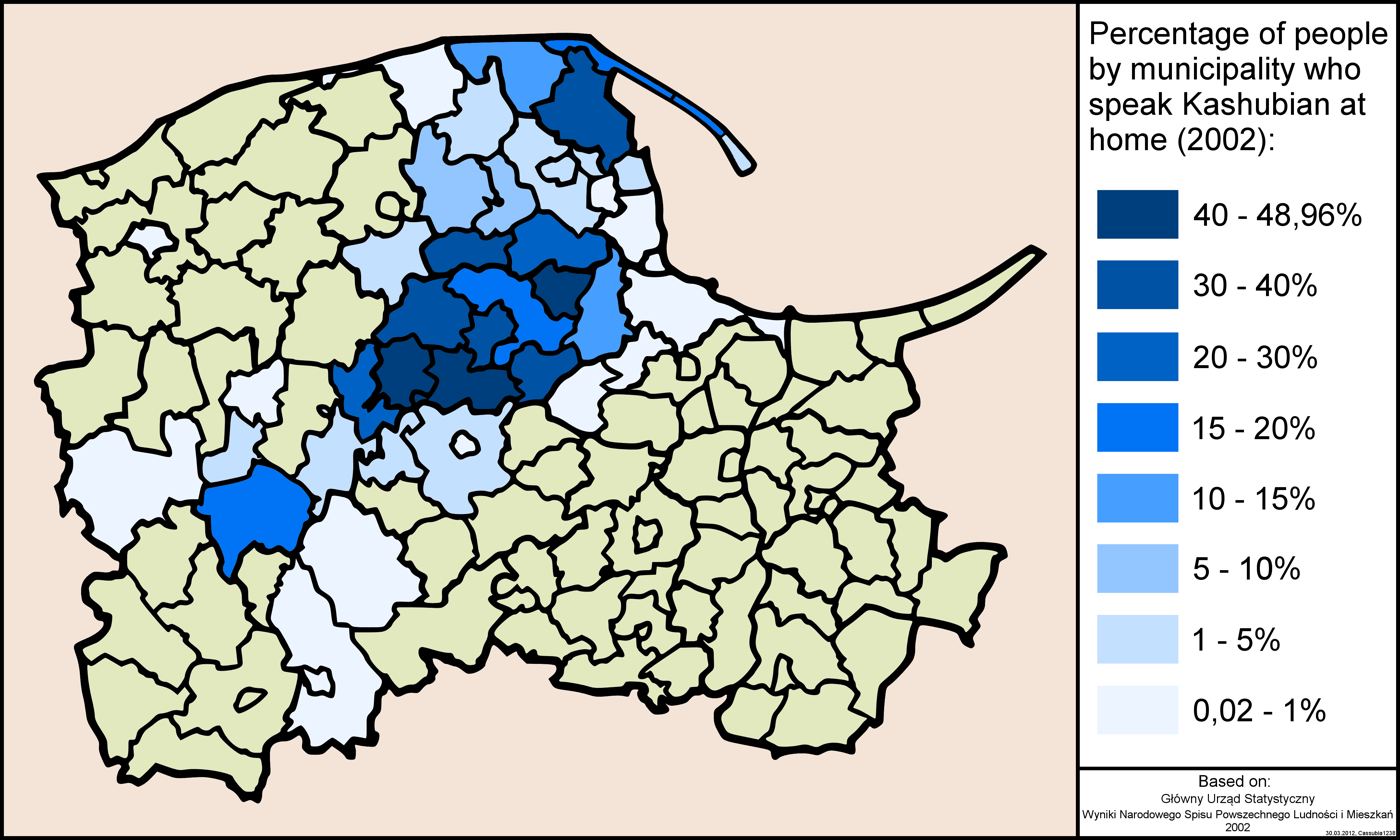
Percentage of people that speak Kashubian at home (2002)

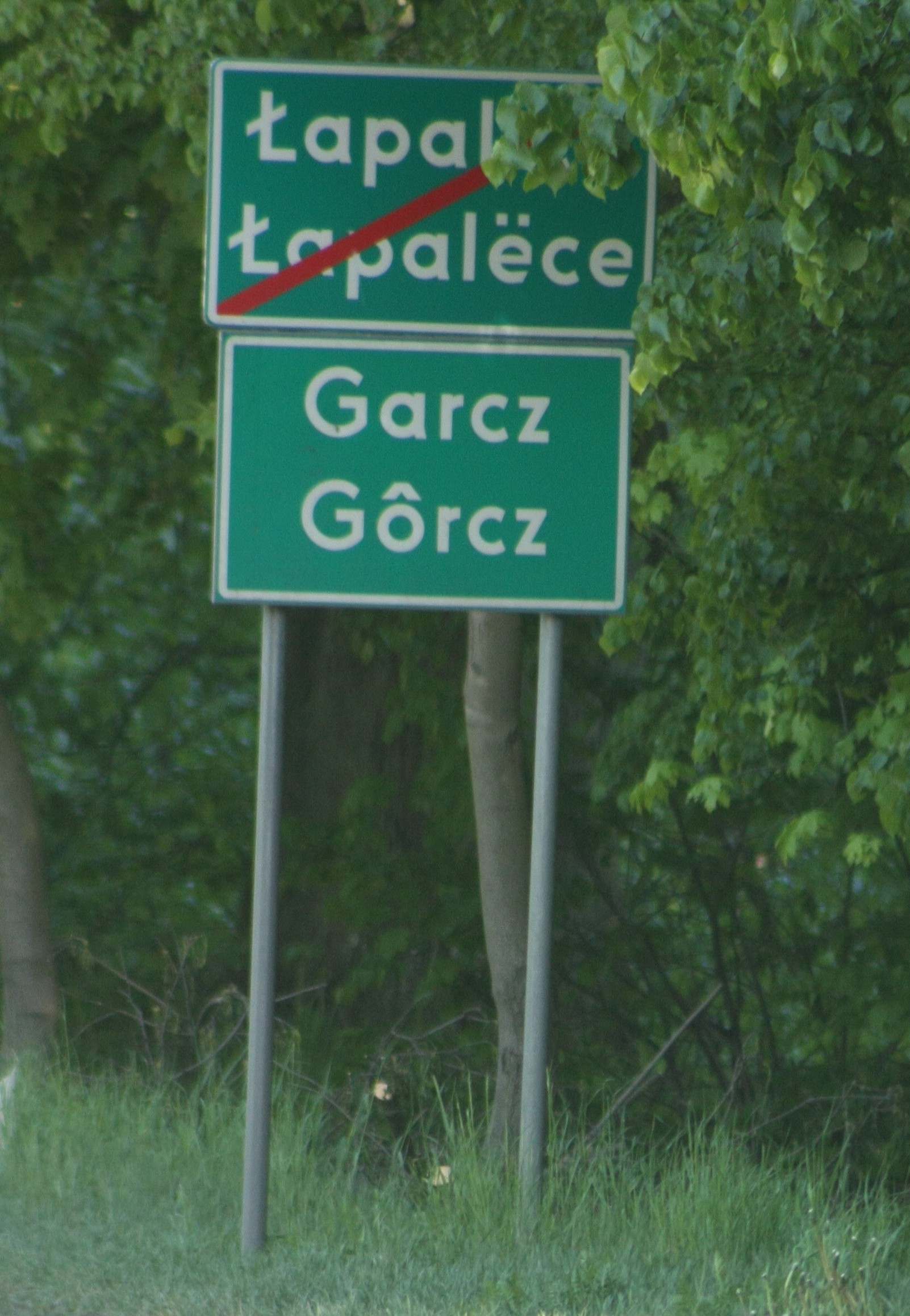
Two bilingual signs in Garcz in Kashubia with the Polish name above and the Kashubian name below

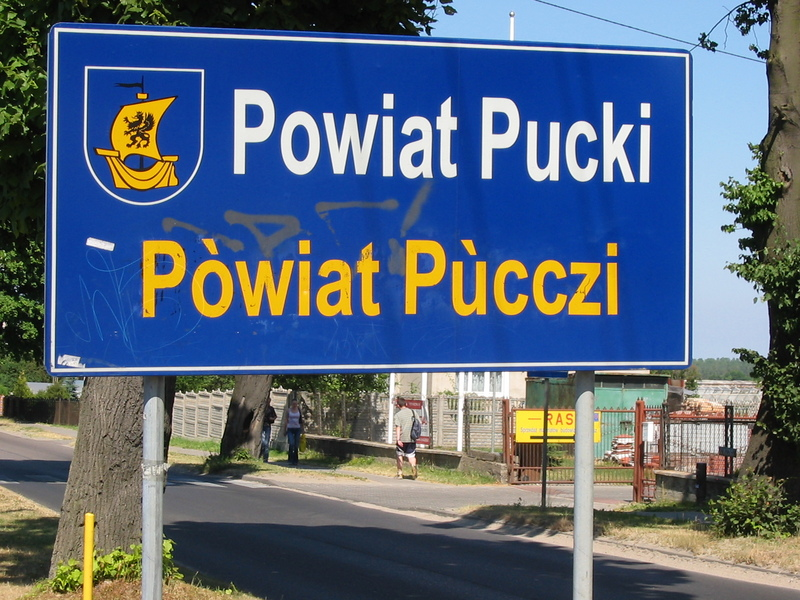
Bilingual sign in Polish and Kashubian in Pogórze, Puck County, Poland, on road from Gdynia to Rewa

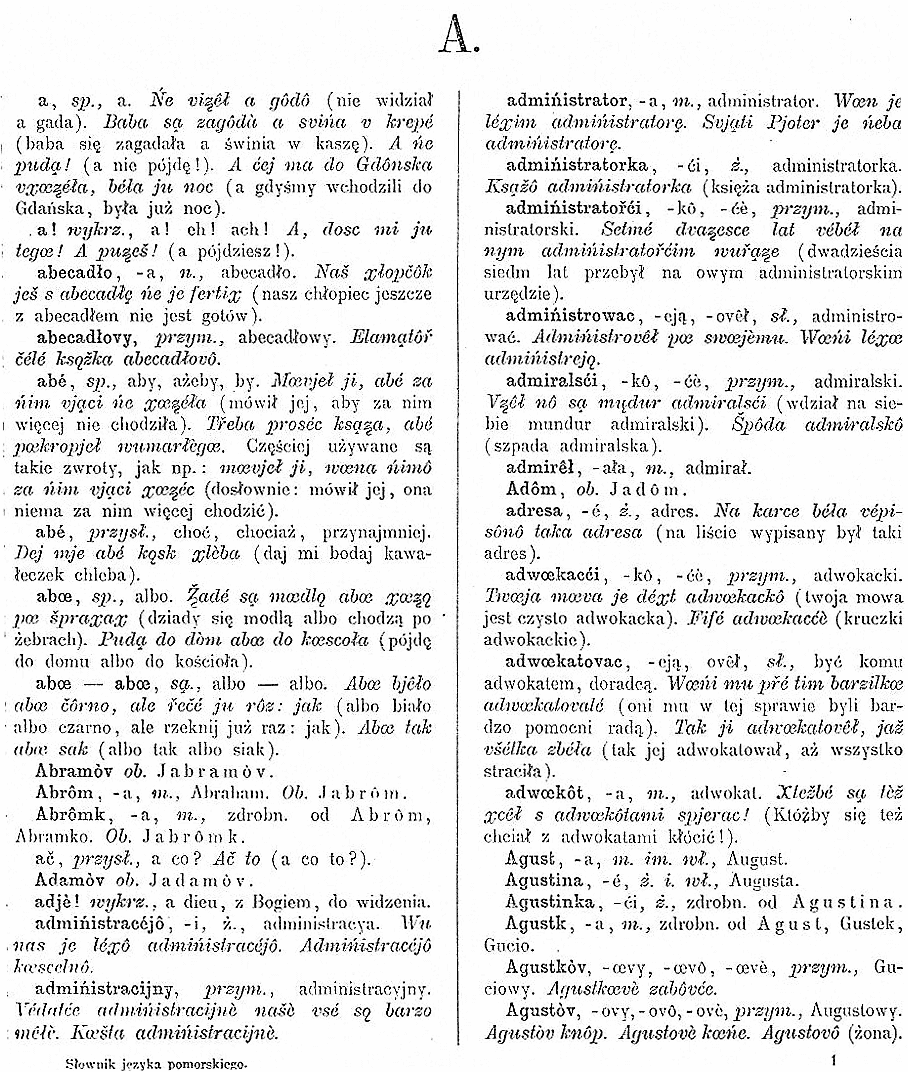
Page of Stefan Ramułt Pomeranian (Kashubian language) Dictionary 1893

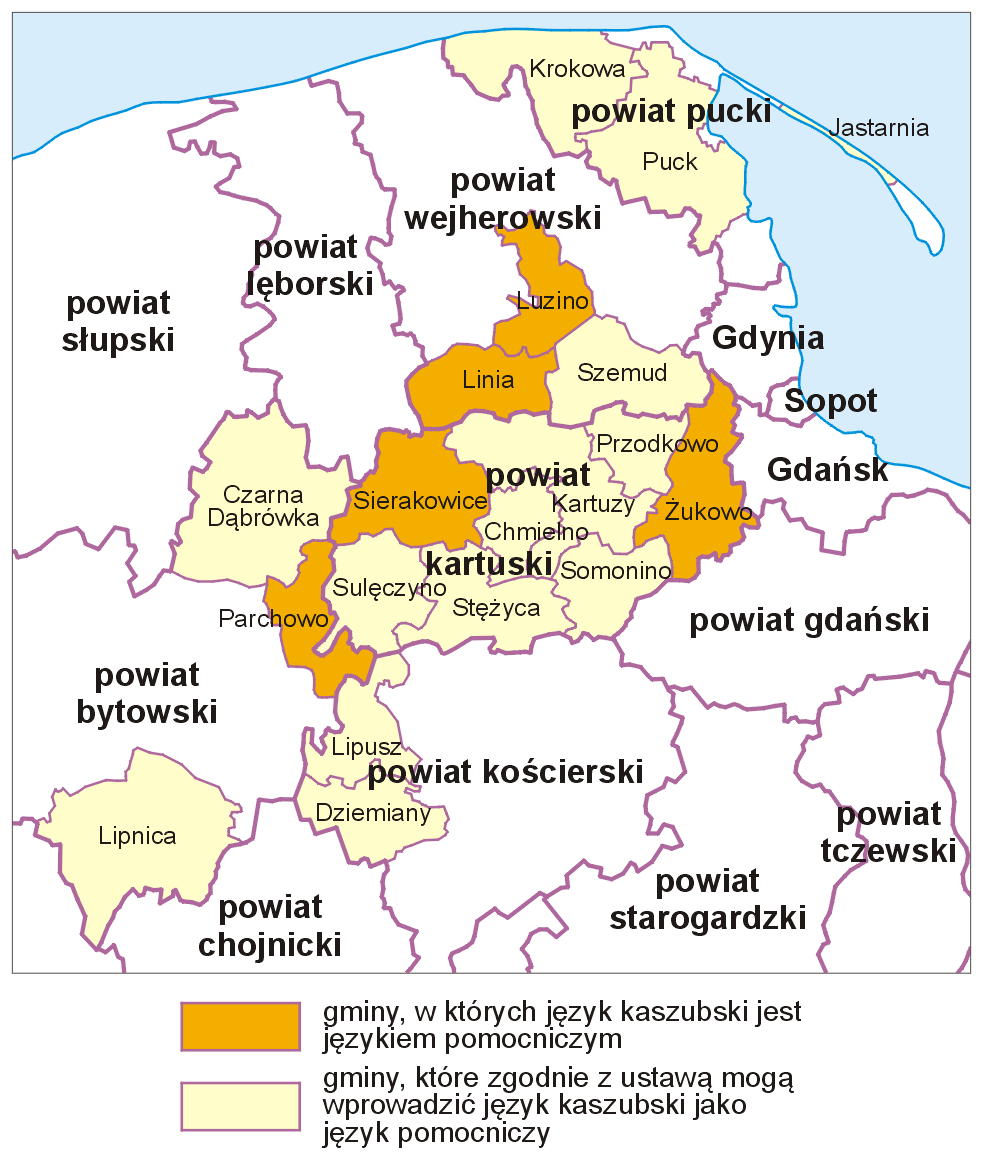
Map showing regions in Poland where Kashubian is recognized as a regional language (orange) and where it could qualify in the upcoming years (yellow)

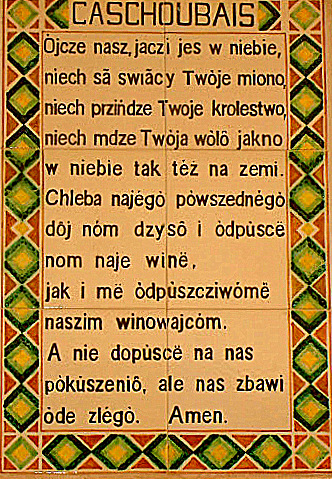
Church of the Pater Noster, Mount of Olives, Jerusalem. Lord's Prayer in Kashubian

== See also ==
- Ł–l merger
- Bilingual communes in Poland
- Gdańsk Pomerania
- Kashubia
- Kashubian alphabet
- Kashubian-Pomeranian Association
- Kashubian studies
- Masurian dialects
- Old Prussian language
- Pomerelia
- Pomeranian language
- Slovincian language

== Bibliography ==
- Breza, Edward; Treder, Jerzy (1981). Maria Kowalewska (ed.). Gramatyka kaszubska: zarys popularny (in Polish). Gdańsk: Zrzeszenie Kaszubsko-Pomorskie (Kaszëbskò-Pòmòrsczé Zrzeszenié). ISBN 83-00-00102-6.
- Makùrôt, Hana (2016). Bożena Ugowska (ed.). Gramatika kaszëbsczégò jãzëka (PDF) (in Kashubian). Gdańsk: Zrzeszenie Kaszubsko-Pomorskie (Kaszëbskò-Pòmòrsczé Zrzeszenié). ISBN 978-83-62137-97-8. Archived (PDF) from the original on 2023-01-25.
