= Kashubian alphabet =

Latin-script alphabet consisting of 34 letters

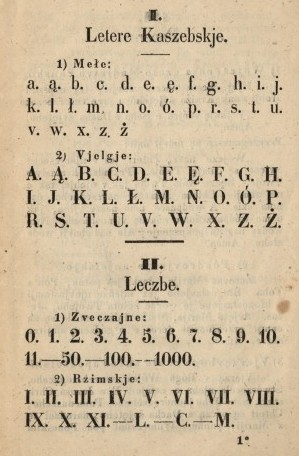
The earlier version of Kashubian alphabet, which dates back to 1850

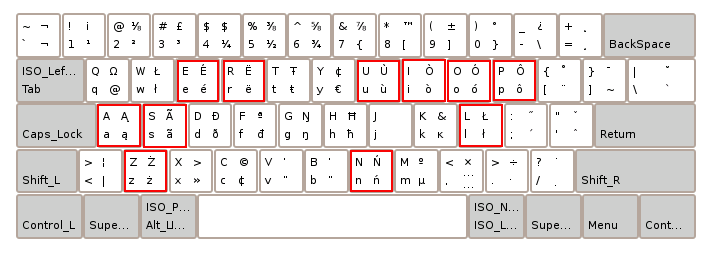
Kashubian keyboard layout

The Kashubian or Cassubian alphabet (kaszëbsczi alfabét, kaszëbsczé abecadło) is the script of the Kashubian language, based on the Latin alphabet. The Kashubian alphabet consists of 34 letters:

A, Ą, Ã, B, C, D, E, É, Ë, F, G, H, I, J, K, L, Ł, M, N, Ń, O, Ò, Ó, Ô, P, R, S, T, U, Ù, W, Y, Z, Ż

The Kashubian language also uses some digraphs: ch, cz, dz, dż, rz and sz. The digraphs cz, dż, sz, ż are pronounced in a different manner from their Polish counterparts – they are palato-alveolar, not retroflex – but rz is pronounced the same as in Polish.

== Pronunciation ==
Upper case	Lower case	Name of letters	Pronunciation
A	a	a	[a]
Ą	ą	ą	[õ]; [ũ] in southern dialects
Ã	ã	ã	[ã]; [ɛ̃] (Puck County, Wejherowo County)
B	b	bé	[b]
C	c	cé	[t͡s]
D	d	dé	[d]
E	e	e	[ɛ]
É	é	é	[e], [ɨ] at the end of a word; [ɨj] in some dialects; [i]/[ɨ] from Puck to Kartuzy
Ë	ë	szwa	[ə]
F	f	éf	[f]
G	g	gé	[ɡ]
H	h	ha	[x]
I	I	i	[i]
J	j	jot	[j]
K	k	ka	[k]
L	l	él	[l]
Ł	ł	éł	[w]; [l] in some northern dialects
M	m	ém	[m]
N	n	én	[n]
Ń	ń	éń	[ɲ]; [jn]; [n]
O	o	o	[ɔ]
Ò	ò	ò	[wɛ]; [wɔ] in loanwords (among some speakers)
Ó	ó	ó	[o]; [u] (southern dialects)
Ô	ô	ô	[ɞ]; [ɛ] (western dialects); [ɔ] (Wejherowo County); [o]/[u] (southern dialects)
P	p	pé	[p]
R	r	ér	[r]
S	s	és	[s]
T	t	té	[t]
U	u	u	[u]
Ù	ù	ù	[wʉ]
W	w	wé	[v]
Y	y	igrek	[i]; [y] in loanwords (among some speakers)
Z	z	zet	[z]
Ż	ż	żet	[ʒ]

=== Consonants combination ===
Upper case	Lower case	Pronunciation
Ch	ch	[x]
Cz	cz	[t͡ʃ]
Dz	dz	[d͡z]
Dż	dż	[d͡ʒ]
Rz	rz	[ʐ]; [r̝]
Sz	sz	[ʃ]

== Literature ==
- Eugeniusz Gòłąbk: Wkôzë kaszëbsczégò pisënkù. Oficyna Czec, Gduńsk 1997, p. 25 ISBN 83-87408-02-6.

== See also ==
- Ł-l merger
- Polish language
