= Pedro Lenz =

Swiss writer

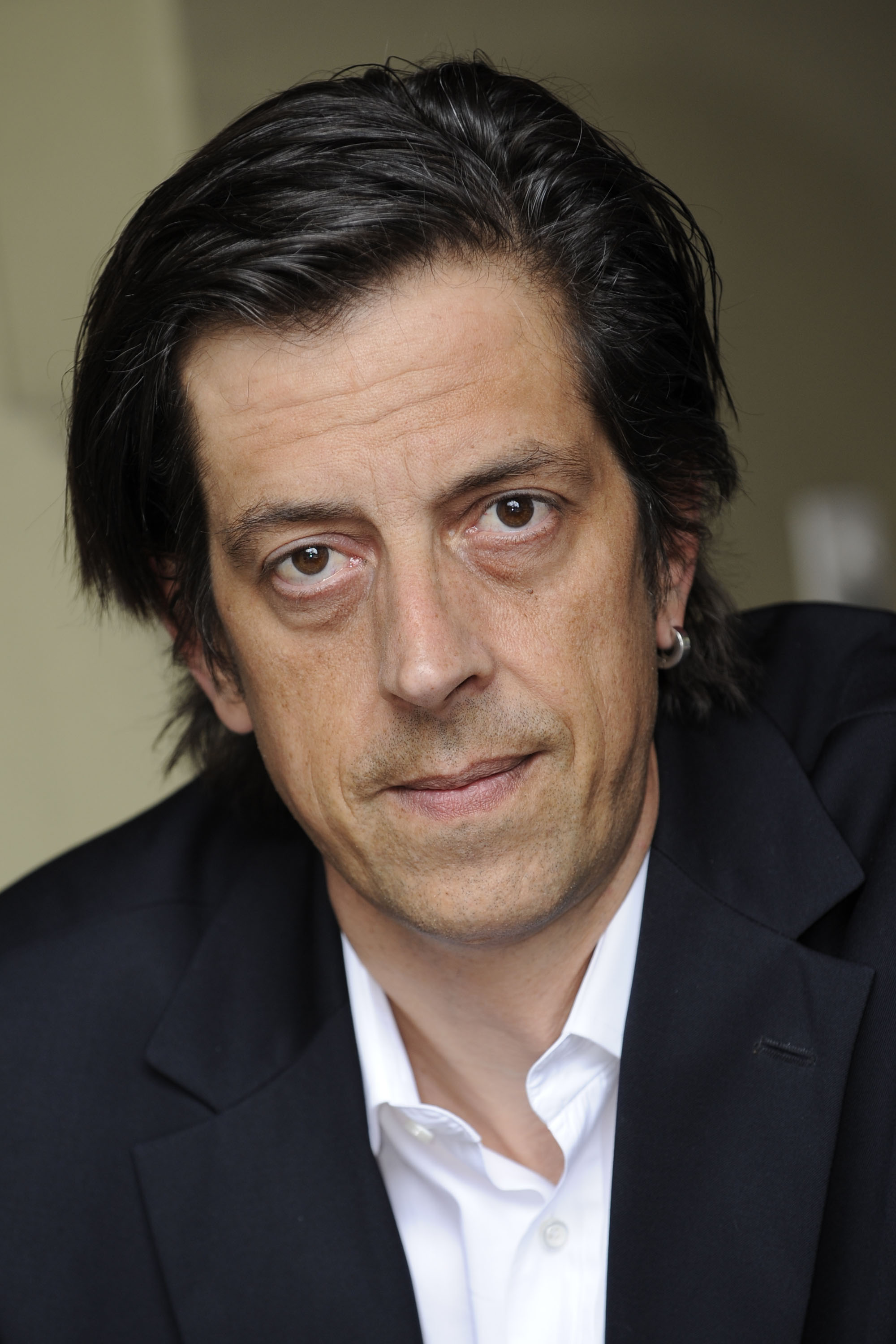
- Pedro Lenz in 2011
- Born: 8 March 1965 (age 61); Langenthal, Switzerland
- Education: University of Bern
- Occupation: Writer
- Writing career
- Language: German, Bernese (Swiss German)
- Years active: 1994–present
- Notable work: Der Goalie bin ig
- Website: www.pedrolenz.ch

Pedro Lenz (born 8 March 1965 in Langenthal) is a Swiss writer.

== Life ==
Lenz studied Spanish literature at the University of Bern. He has worked full-time as a writer since 2001.

He writes columns for several newspapers in Switzerland, including the Neue Zürcher Zeitung and WOZ Die Wochenzeitung. He is also active in Bern's spoken word scene, performing as part of the Hohe Stirnen ('high foreheads') group. He lives in Olten.

His 2010 novel Der Goalie bin ig – written in Swiss German – won several prizes and was translated into Scots by Donal McLaughlin under the title Naw Much of a Talker. The novel was made into a film (English title: I Am the Keeper) that was a major winner at the 2014 Swiss Film Awards with seven nominations from which it won four trophies including Best Feature Film. The film, directed by Sabine Boss, is notable for its dialogue in Bernese German. The film played at the Locarno Film Festival in August 2014.

== Works ==
- Die Welt ist ein Taschentuch. Gedichte von da, von dort und von drüben. X-Time, Bern 2002, ISBN 3-909990-08-8.
- Momente mit Menschen. Ein Mosaik. 71 Portraits. Stämpfli, Bern 2002, ISBN 3-9520209-2-3.
- Tarzan in der Schweiz. Gesammelte Kolumnen zur gesprochenen Sprache. X-Time, Bern 2003, ISBN 3-909990-12-6.
- Das Kleine Lexikon der Provinzliteratur. Bilger, Zürich 2005, ISBN 978-3-908010-72-2.
- Plötzlech hets di am Füdle. Banale Geschichten. Cosmos, Muri bei Bern 2008, ISBN 978-3-305-00425-6.
- Der Goalie bin ig. Roman. Verlag Der gesunde Menschenversand, Luzern 2010, ISBN 978-3-905825-17-6.
- Tanze wi ne Schmätterling. Die Coiffeuse und der Boxer. Cosmos, Muri bei Bern 2010, ISBN 978-3-305-00426-3.
- (Hrsg.) Carl Albert Loosli: Loosli für die Jackentasche. Geschichten, Gedichte und Satiren. Rotpunkt, Zürich 2010, ISBN 978-3-85869-426-3.
- Liebesgschichte, Roman, Cosmos, Muri bei Bern, 2012, ISBN 978-3-305-00428-7.
- I bi meh aus eine. Die bemerkenswerte Geschichte eines Emmentaler Siedlers. Cosmos, Muri bei Bern, 2012, ISBN 978-3-305-00465-2.
- Radio. Morgengeschichten. Verlag Der gesunde Menschenversand, Luzern 2014, ISBN 978-3-905825-92-3.
- Wienachtsgschichte – von Klaus Schädelin bis Pedro Lenz Cosmos, Muri bei Bern, 2014, ISBN 978-3-305-00468-3.
- Fussball und andere Randsportarten (mit Etrit Hasler), Kolumnen aus der WOZ, WOZ Die Wochenzeitung, Zürich, 2014, ISBN 978-3-906236-12-4.
- Der Gondoliere der Berge. Cosmos, Muri bei Bern 2015, ISBN 978-3-305-00467-6

== Works in English ==
- Naw Much of a Talker, Translator Donal McLaughlin, Freight Books, 2013, ISBN 9781908754226
