= Mani Matter =

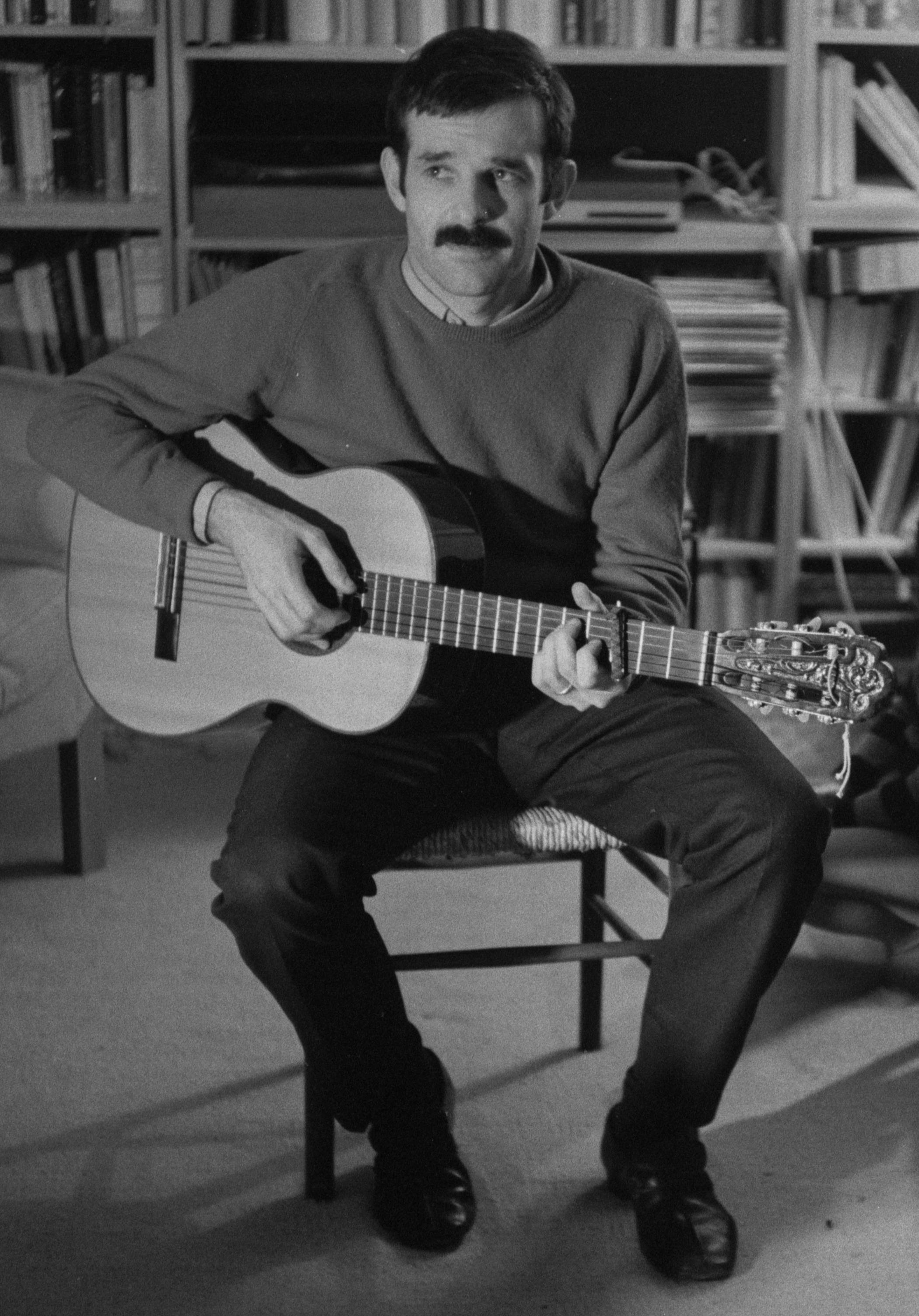
- Mani Matter (1970)

Background information
- Born: Hans-Peter Matter; 4 August 1936; Herzogenbuchsee, Switzerland
- Died: 24 November 1972 (aged 36) Kilchberg, Zurich, Switzerland
- Instruments: Vocals, guitar
- Years active: 1965–1972
- Labels: Zytglogge
- Website: www.manimatter.ch

Mani Matter (4 August 1936 in Herzogenbuchsee – 24 November 1972 in Kilchberg, Zurich, officially Hans-Peter Matter) was a popular Swiss singer-songwriter.

== Biography ==
Mani Matter was born on 4 August 1936 in Herzogenbuchsee, Canton of Bern. His father, Erwin Matter, was a lawyer, his mother, the Dutch woman Wilhelmina Matter-de Haan, was a secretary. He had a two years older sister, Helen Matter.

Growing up in Bern, he started to perform his own chansons in contemporary Bernese German at local venues and on the radio; he accompanied himself on the guitar. He was an active Boy Scout in the Pfadicorps Patria in Bern and he performed his first own songs during Boy Scout evenings. He also performed together with the Berner Troubadours (Bernese troubadours). He was killed in a car accident on his way to a concert and is buried in the Bremgartenfriedhof in Bern. Mani Matter's literary estate is archived in the Swiss Literary Archives in Bern.

== Legacy ==
His Bernese German songs remain very popular in the Swiss German speaking part of Switzerland, and Matter is a great influence on the dialect music scene in Bern, and his songs are frequently covered. A collection of cover-versions was published in 1992 on the album Matter Rock. Mani Matter's chansons are often taught at school (including classes for adults wanting to learn Bernese German) and are famous for their soft irony.

== Discography ==
- 1966 I han en Uhr erfunde (EP, "I invented a watch")
- 1967 Alls wo mir id Finger chunnt (EP, "Anything I touch")
- 1970 Hemmige (EP, "Inhibitions")
- 1972 Betrachtige über nes Sändwitsch (EP, "Contemplations on a sandwich")
- 1973 Ir Ysebahn (LP, "On the train")
- 1973 I han es Zündhölzli azündt (double-LP, "I lit a match")
