= Olga (2021 film) =

2021 sports drama film

- Promotional release poster
- Directed by: Elie Grappe
- Written by: Elie Grappe; Raphaëlle Desplechin
- Produced by: Tom Dercourt; Jean-Marc Fröhle
- Starring: Anastasia Budiashkina
- Cinematography: Lucie Baudinaud
- Edited by: Suzana Pedro
- Music by: Pierre Desprats
- Production companies: Point Prod; Cinémadefacto
- Release date: July 2021 (Cannes)
- Running time: 85 minutes
- Countries: Switzerland; France
- Languages: French; Ukrainian

Olga (Ukrainian: Ольга, romanized: Olha) is a 2021 sports drama film co-written and directed by Elie Grappe. The film was selected as the Swiss entry for the Best International Feature Film at the 94th Academy Awards. It won the SACD Award at the 2021 Cannes Critics’ Week and later won the Swiss Film Awards for Best Feature Film, Best Screenplay, and Best Sound.

== Synopsis ==
In 2013, Olga, a 15-year-old Ukrainian gymnast living in exile in Switzerland, tries to secure a place on the national team. As she prepares for the European Championships, the Euromaidan uprising breaks out in Kyiv, drawing in the people who matter most to her and upending her life.

== Cast ==
The cast includes:

- Anastasia Budiashkina as Olga
- Caterina Barloggio as Steffi
- Jérôme Martin as Adrien
- Théa Brogli as Zoé
- Alicia Onomor as Juliette
- Lou Steffen as Andrea
- Tanya Mikhina as Ilona
- Sabrina Rubtsova as Sasha

== Production ==
The film was five years in the making. To increase authenticity, Elie Grappe cast real gymnasts in the main roles. Filming was interrupted by the Covid-19 lockdown in March 2020, with about two weeks of shooting still remaining. Grappe also incorporated archive footage of the Euromaidan uprising into the film.

== Reception ==
=== Awards and nominations ===
At the 2021 Cannes Critics’ Week, it won the SACD Award, which went to its screenwriters, Elie Grappe and Raphaëlle Desplechin. It also won the AISGE Award for Best Actress at the 2021 Gijón International Film Festival. In 2022, it won three awards at the Zlín International Film Festival for Children and Youth. That same year, it won the Swiss Film Awards for Best Feature Film, Best Screenplay, and Best Sound.

The film was selected as the Swiss entry for the Best International Feature Film at the 94th Academy Awards, but it did not make the shortlist.

=== Critical response ===
Filmdienst described the film as a coming-of-age and sports drama that revolves around experiences of alienation and vulnerability, and praised its sensitive lead performance and striking visual ideas. In its coverage of the 2022 Swiss Film Awards, SRF wrote that Olga was among the films recognized for their cinematic qualities and political foresight.

On Rotten Tomatoes, the film has an approval rating of 92% based on 36 reviews. On Metacritic, it has a weighted average score of 77 out of 100 based on 10 critic reviews, indicating "generally favorable reviews".

== Festival screenings ==
The film premiered in July 2021. Later festival screenings included the International Film Festival of India Goa and the Gijón International Film Festival in 2021, and the Palm Springs International Film Festival, the Solothurn Film Festival, and the Locarno Film Festival in 2022.

== See also ==
- List of submissions to the 94th Academy Awards for Best International Feature Film
- List of Swiss submissions for the Academy Award for Best International Feature Film
