= Mattenenglisch =

Sociolect and word game of the working class of Bern

Mattenenglisch (Bernese German: Mattenänglisch, lit. 'Matte English'), also Mattenberndeutsch (Matte-Bärndütsch), is a name for the Alemannic German varieties traditionally spoken in the Matte, the old working class neighbourhood of the Swiss city of Bern. It is used in two different senses: either for the traditional sociolect of that neighbourhood, or for a special kind of Pig Latin that was used there. From the second half of the 20th century, since the older social stratification completely changed and the Matte ceased to be a working-class neighbourhood, both lects have fallen out of use. However, there are voluntary associations that cultivate Mattenenglisch.

== Mattenenglisch sociolect ==
The Mattenenglisch sociolect was the working class variety of the Bernese German dialect. It had a characteristic vocabulary that was partly influenced by varieties such as Rotwelsch, Jenisch or Yiddish, because people wanted to communicate in a way the police would not understand. While most Mattenenglisch words have fallen out of use, some have spread into common Bernese German usage, thus becoming shibboleths of Bernese German, for instance the words jiu 'yes', Modi 'girl' or Gieu 'boy'.

== Mattenenglisch Pig Latin ==
Until the mid 20th century, a special variety of Pig Latin was used by the kids in the Matte neighbourhood. Unlike in other varieties of Pig Latin, the first vowel of the word is completely substituted.

The rules are as follows:

1. For words that begin with consonant sounds, move the initial consonant or consonant cluster to the end of the word, add ee and change the first vowel into i. Examples:
  - Mueter 'mother' → Ieter-mee
  - gib-ere 'give-her' → ibere-gee
  - Schnure 'mouth' → Ire-schnee
2. For words that begin with vowel sounds, add the syllable ee to the end of the word, or hee if the word ends in a vowel, and change the first vowel into i. Examples:
  - Änglisch 'English' → Inglisch-ee
  - Öpfu 'apple' → Ipfu-hee
