= Triphthong smoothing =

Sound change

Specimen of triphthong smoothing
Male Received Pronunciation speaker displaying triphthong smoothing in the words shower and fire.

Within Received Pronunciation (RP), triphthong smoothing refers to the sound change of a triphthong to a smaller unit of sound; either a diphthong or pure vowel. In the latter case, smoothing is sometimes referred to as monophthongisation.

The opposite process, whereby a monophthong becomes a sequence of two or more vowels, is known as vowel breaking or fracture.

Triphthong smoothing takes place between a diphthong and schwa sound (/ə/), often before a lateral approximant or historical r, though neither liquid consonant is required for smoothing to occur.

Smoothing may also take place across word boundaries, when a word-final diphthong is present before a schwa; e.g. tie a knot (/taɪ ə nɒt/) or stay away (/steɪ əˈweɪ/).

Although primarily associated with RP, the pronunciations of some common words are the result of smoothing, such as our /ɑ(r)/, prayer /pɹɛə(r)/, and (outside North America) mayor (/mɛːə/).

== Diphthongs and triphthongs in Received Pronunciation ==
=== Diphthongs ===
Diphthongs of RP. From Roach (2004, p. 242) (Note: Note that the first elements of some diphthongs diverge quite sharply from the position their IPA symbols usually occupy (e.g. /eə/ is normally transcribed /ɛə/). This is done for historical reasons.)

RP is traditionally ascribed eight diphthongs: the five closing diphthongs /eɪ/, /aɪ/, /ɔɪ/, /əʊ/, and /aʊ/, and the centring diphthongs /ɛə/, /ɪə/, and /ʊə/.

Of these eight, the three centring diphthongs are not able to undergo smoothing, due to the fact that they are never followed by another schwa.

Diphthong	Example	
Closing
/eɪ/	/beɪ/	bay
/aɪ/	/baɪ/	buy
/ɔɪ/	/bɔɪ/	boy
/əʊ/	/bəʊ/	beau
/aʊ/	/baʊ/	bough
Centring
/ɛə/	/bɛə/	bear
/ɪə/	/bɪə/	beer
/ʊə/	/bʊə/	boor

=== Triphthongs ===
A chart of the five "triphthongs" in Received Pronunciation as described in the section diphthongs + [ə] by Cruttenden (2008).

The five closing diphthongs followed by a schwa - /aɪə/, /ɑʊə/, /əʊə/, /eɪə/, and /ɔɪə/ - are often labelled triphthongs, even if in practice they are rarely pronounced in one syllable as true triphthongs are. This is due to their shared tendency to undergo smoothing, as compared to other three-vowel sequences as in clayey or reaudit.

== Degrees of smoothing ==
There are two degrees of smoothing in RP. In the first, the medial element of a triphthong is elided, creating a new diphthong composed of a long vowel and schwa. In the second degree, the diphthongs are further reduced to long vowels.

Degrees of smoothing in the five "triphthongs"
Triphthong	General	Advanced	Example words (Note: Though not evident from spelling, many words that appear to be composed of a single-syllable diphthong are in fact disyllabic with a schwa. For example, many English speakers pronounce oil in two syllables as: /ɔɪ.əl/.)
/aɪə/	/aːə/	/aː/	buyer, choir, liable, pyre, science
/ɑʊə/	/ɑːə/	/ɑː/	bower, flour, fowl, nowadays
/əʊə/	/əː/	/ɜː/	blower, Goa, poem
/eɪə/	/eːə/	/ɛː/	aorist, greyer, player
/ɔɪə/	/ɔːə/	/ɔː/	lawyer, employer, toil

=== General ===
The diphthongs (and one monophthong) resulting from triphthong smoothing in Received Pronunciation.

General smoothing creates four new centring diphthongs: /aːə/, /ɑːə/, /eːə/, and /ɔːə/. In the case of the /əʊə/ triphthong, smoothing results in a lengthened schwa sound (/əː/).

The newly created diphthong /eə/ is commonly assimilated with the /ɛə/ diphthong, creating homophones between lair and layer. For speakers who merge /a/ with /ɑ/, tire and tower will also be homophones.

=== Advanced ===
The monophthongs resulting from the advanced smoothing of triphthongs in Received Pronunciation. Note the shift of the /eɪə/ and /əʊə/ triphthongs to a more open position.

In advanced smoothing, the medial vowel and final schwa are elided, leaving behind a long vowel. The already lengthened and monophthongal /əː/ is lowered to /ɜː/.

Advanced smoothing creates numerous homophones, most prominently among speakers who already exhibit the merger between /a/ and /ɑ/, leading to the tar-tire-tower merger.

Tar-tire-tower merger homophones
/ɑʊə/	/aɪə/	/ɑː(r)/	/ɑː/	IPA
Bauer/bower	buyer	bar	baa/bah	/ˈbɑː/
coward/cowered	-	card	-	/ˈkɑːd/
cower	-	car	ka	/ˈkɑː/
dowel	dial	-	dahl	/'dɑːl/
-	fire	far	fah	/ˈfɑː/
flour/flower	flyer	-	-	/ˈflɑː/
hour/our	ire	ar/are	ah	/ˈɑː/
Howard	hired	hard	ha-ed	/ˈhɑːd/
how're	hire	har	ha	/ˈhɑː/
-	mire	mar	ma	/ˈmɑː/
owl	aisle/I'll/isle	arle	aal	/ˈɑːl/
-	pious	parse	pass	/ˈpɑːs/
power	pyre	par	pa	/ˈpɑː/
scour	-	scar	ska	/ˈskɑː/
shower	shire/shyer	-	shah	/ˈʃɑː/
showered	shired	shard	-	/ˈʃɑːd/
sour	sigher/sire	Saar	-	/ˈsɑː/
-	spier/spire	spar	spa	/ˈspɑː/
tower	tier/tire/tyre	tar	ta	/ˈtɑː/
trowel	trial	-	-	/'trɑːl/
vowel	vial	-	Vaal	/'vɑːl/

In Standard Southern British, the diphthong /ɛə/ is commonly reduced to long /ɛː/, producing homophones between pear and payer. Smoothing slower and mower to /ɜː/ creates homophones with slur and myrrh respectively.

The open-mid back rounded vowel (/ɔː/) is produced with the tongue in a lower position and is better transcribed as [ɔ̝ː]. This allows a distinction to be made between the smoothed vowel in coir ([kɔ̝ː]) and the unsmoothed vowel found in core (/kɔː/).

== See also ==
- Diphthongisation
- Fusion (phonetics)
- Monophthongisation
- Syncope (phonology)
- Synaeresis

== Bibliography ==
- Ashby, Patricia (2011), Understanding Phonetics (Understanding Language), London: Hodder Education, ISBN 9780340928271
- Cruttenden, Alan (2008) [First published 1962], Gimson's Pronunciation of English (7th ed.), London: Hodder Education, ISBN 9780340958773
- Jowitt, David (2001), In defence of triphthongs, vol. 17, Cambridge University Press, pp. 36–41, doi:10.1017/S0266078401003054
- Roach, Peter (1992), Introducing Phonetics, London: Penguin English, ISBN 0140810196
- Roach, Peter (2004), British English: Received Pronunciation (PDF), vol. 34, England: Cambridge University Press, pp. 239–245, doi:10.1017/S0025100304001768
- Tomaka, Maciej (2017), "On reduction in English: what the English don't say", New Horizons in English Studies, Krakow: Jagiellonian University in Krakow, doi:10.17951/nh.2017.2.25
