= Triphthong =

Vowel sound involving motion through 3 vowel qualities

In phonetics, a triphthong (UK: /ˈtrɪfθɒŋ, ˈtrɪpθɒŋ/ TRIF-thong, TRIP-thong, US: /-θɔːŋ/ -thawng) (from Greek τρίφθογγος triphthongos, lit. 'with three sounds' or 'with three tones') is a monosyllabic vowel combination involving a quick but smooth movement of the articulator from one vowel quality to another that passes over a third. While "pure" vowels, or monophthongs, are said to have one target articulator position, diphthongs have two and triphthongs three.

Triphthongs are not to be confused with disyllabic sequences of a diphthong followed by a monophthong, as in German Feuer [ˈfɔʏ.ɐ] 'fire', where the final vowel is longer than those found in triphthongs.

== Examples ==
Triphthongs that feature close elements typically analyzed as /j/ and /w/ in phonology are not listed. For instance, the Polish word łój [wuj] 'tallow' is typically analyzed as /CVC/ - a sequence of a consonant followed by a vowel and another consonant. This is because the palatal approximant is resyllabified in some inflected forms, such as łojami [wɔˈjami] (instr. pl.), and also because /w/ occurs word-finally after a consonant just like /l/ does (compare przemysł [ˈpʂɛmɨsw] 'industry' with Przemyśl [ˈpʂɛmɨɕl] 'Przemyśl'), which means that both of them behave more like consonants than vowels.

On the other hand, [ɪ̯, i̯, ʊ̯, u̯] are not treated as phonetic consonants when they arise from vocalization of /l/, /v/ or /ɡ/ as they do not share almost any of their features with those three.

=== First segment is the nucleus ===
==== Bernese German ====
Bernese German has the following triphthongs:

- [iə̯u̯] as in Gieu 'boy'
- [yə̯u̯] as in Gfüeu 'feeling'
- [uə̯u̯] as in Schueu 'school'

They have arisen due to the vocalization of /l/ in the syllable coda; compare the last two with Standard German Gefühl [ɡəˈfyːl] and Schule [ˈʃuːlə], the last one with a schwa not present in the Bernese word.

==== Danish ====
Danish has the following triphthongs:

- [ɛɐ̯u̯] as in færge 'ferry'
- [iɐ̯u̯] as in hvirvle 'to whirl'
- [œ̞ɐ̯u̯] as in Børge, a given name
- [uɐ̯u̯] as in spurv 'sparrow'

==== English ====
In British Received Pronunciation, and most other non-rhotic (r-dropping) varieties of English, monosyllabic triphthongs with r are optionally distinguished from sequences with disyllabic realizations:

- [aʊ̯ə̯] as in: flour (compare with disyllabic "flower" [aʊ̯.ə])
- [aɪ̯ə̯] as in: hire (compare with disyllabic "higher" [aɪ̯.ə])
- [ɔɪ̯ə̯] as in: coir (compare with disyllabic "coyer" [ɔɪ̯.ə]), loir (compare with disyllabic "lawyer" [ɔɪ̯.ə])

[aʊ̯ə̯, aɪ̯ə̯, ɔɪ̯ə̯] are sometimes transcribed as ⟨awə, ajə, ɔjə⟩, or similarly.

As [eɪ̯] and [əʊ̯] become [ɛə̯] and [ɔː] respectively before /r/, most instances of [eɪ̯.ə] and [əʊ̯.ə] are words with the suffix "-er", such as player and slower. Less commonly, triphthongs appear as an inseparable part of a word, as in iron, society, or sour. Other instances are from loanwords or words derived from foreign sources, such as aorist, boa, and choir.

A unique aspect of English triphthongs, as compared to other sequences of three vowels, is their shared tendency to undergo reduction via a process known as smoothing.

=== Second segment is the nucleus ===
Spanish:

- [u̯ei̯] as in buey [ˈbu̯ei̯] 'ox'
- [u̯ai̯] as in Uruguay [uɾuˈɣu̯ai̯] 'Uruguay'
- [i̯ai̯] as in cambiáis [kamˈbi̯ai̯s] 'you [informal plural] change'
- [i̯ei̯] as in cambiéis [kamˈbi̯ei̯s] 'that you [informal plural] may change'

The last two are mostly restricted to European Spanish. In Latin American Spanish (which has no distinct vosotros form), the corresponding words are cambian [ˈkambi̯an] and cambien [ˈkambi̯en], with a rising-opening diphthong followed by a nasal stop and initial, rather than final stress. In phonology, [u̯ei̯, u̯ai̯, i̯ai̯, i̯ei̯] are analyzed as a monosyllabic sequence of three vowels: /uei, uai, iai, iei/. In Help:IPA/Spanish, those triphthongs are transcribed ⟨wej, waj, jaj, jej⟩: [ˈbwej], [uɾuˈɣwaj], [kamˈbjajs], [kamˈbjejs]

== See also ==
- Hiatus
- Index of phonetics articles
- List of vowels
- List of phonetics topics
- Semivowel
- Vowel breaking

== Bibliography ==
- Gütter, Adolf (1971), Nordbairischer Sprachatlas, Munich: R. Lerche
- Wells, John C. (1982), Accents of English, Vol. 2: The British Isles (pp. i–xx, 279–466), Cambridge University Press, doi:10.1017/CBO9780511611759, ISBN 0-52128540-2
