= Friedrich Lorentz =

German historian

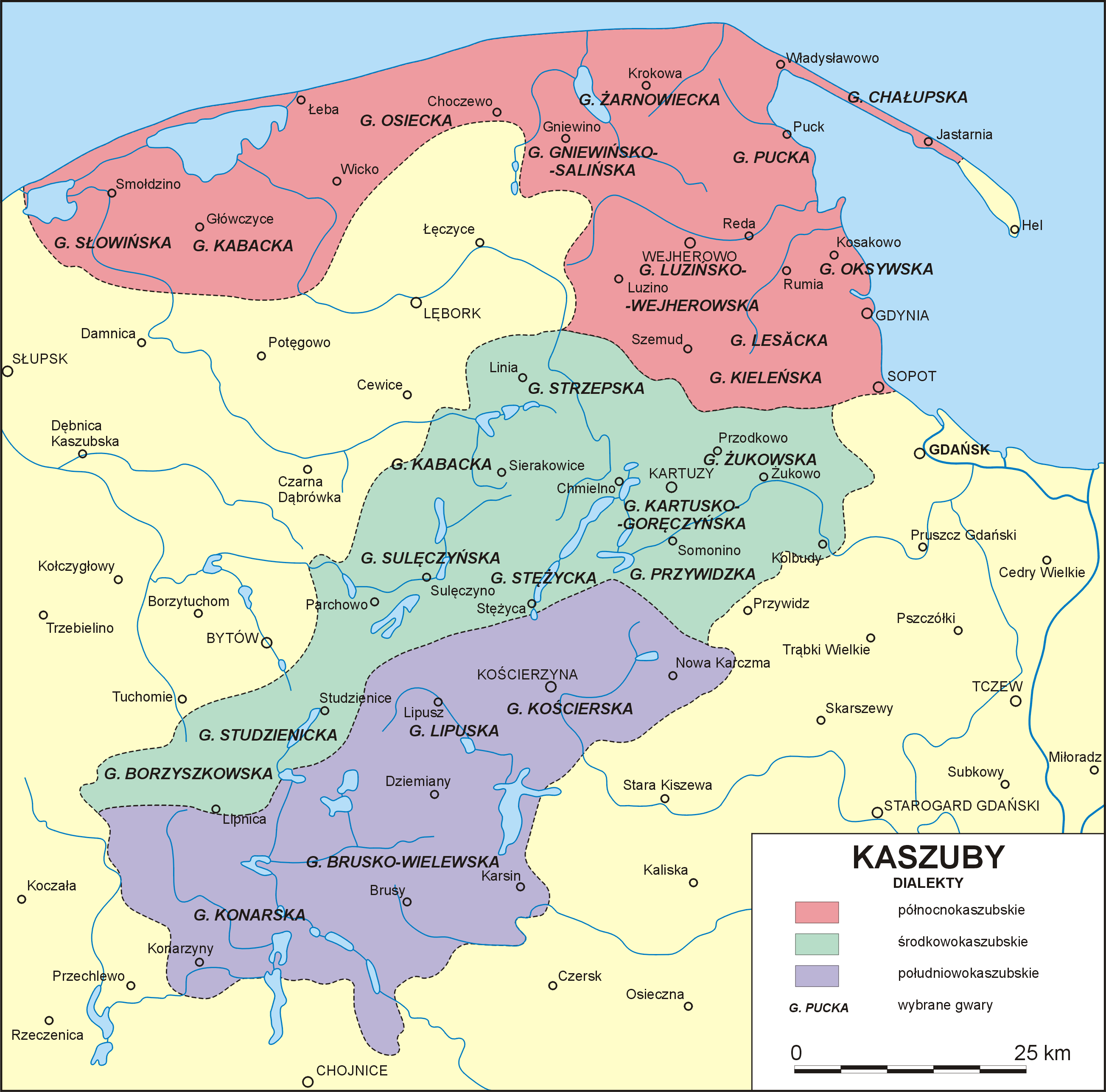
Kashubian dialects area in the early 20th century - as wrote Friedrich Lorentz

Friedrich Lorentz (18 December 1870, Güstrow – 29 March 1937) was a German historian. He is the author of publications in the field of linguistics, as well as Kashubian and Slovincian culture. As he wrote, Kashubian is a language having 76 different subdialects.

== Works ==
- Slovinzische Texte S.-Peterburg : Izdanìe Vtorogo Otdělenìâ Imperatorskoj Akademìi Nauk, 1905.
- Kaszubi: kultura ludowa i język, translated as The Cassubian Civilization by Friedrich Lorentz and A. Fischer with Tadeusz Lehr-Spławiński, London, Faber and Faber, 1935.
