= I Am the Keeper =

- German: Der Goalie bin ig
- Directed by: Sabine Boss
- Written by: Jasmine Hoch; Sabine Boss; Pedro Lenz
- Produced by: Michael Steiger; Anita Wasser; Theres Scherer-Kollbrunner
- Starring: Marcus Signer
- Cinematography: Michael Saxer
- Edited by: Stefan Kälin
- Music by: Peter von Siebenthal; Richard Köchli
- Production companies: C-FILMS AG; Carac Film AG; SRG SSR
- Release date: 24 January 2014 (SFT)
- Running time: 92 minutes
- Country: Switzerland
- Language: Swiss German

I Am the Keeper (German: Der Goalie bin ig) is a 2014 Swiss drama film directed by Sabine Boss and based on the novel of the same name by Pedro Lenz. It premiered in January 2014 and went on to win four awards at the 2014 Swiss Film Awards, including Best Feature Film and Best Actor.

== Synopsis ==
After serving a year in prison, Ernst, known as "Goalie", returns to the small town where he grew up and tries to start over without drugs. He finds a job and falls in love with the waitress Regula, but as he begins to rebuild his life, his past catches up with him.

== Cast ==
The cast includes:

- Marcus Signer as Goalie
- Sonja Riesen as Regula
- Pascal Ulli as Ueli
- Michael Neuenschwander as Pesche
- Thomas U. Hostettler as Stofer

== Production ==
The film was adapted from Pedro Lenz’s novel of the same name and was shot in Swiss German in Langenthal and Italy. Its title song, “Der Goalie”, was written by ZüriWest frontman Kuno Lauener.

== Reception ==
=== Awards and nominations ===
The film won awards including the 2014 Bern Film Prize, the 2014 Audience Award for Best Feature Film from Bern Film Promotion, first place in the 2015 Zurich Film Prize feature film category, and Der fliegende Ochse at the 2015 Filmkunstfest Mecklenburg-Vorpommern. At the 2014 Swiss Film Awards, it won Best Feature Film, Best Actor, Best Film Score, and Best Screenplay, and was nominated for Best Actress and Best Film Editing.

=== Critical response ===
Filmdienst described the film as an adaptation of a Swiss dialect novel with a laconic portrayal of its social milieu, and called it a sympathetic film with good performances and social-critical touches. SRF described the film as a wonderful adaptation of Pedro Lenz’s novel and praised it as strong, beautiful and sad.

== Festival screenings ==
The film was later screened at festivals including the 2014 Solothurn Film Festival, 2014 Locarno Film Festival, 2014 Mannheim-Heidelberg International Film Festival, the 2015 Filmkunstfest Mecklenburg-Vorpommern, and the 2015 Gässli Film Festival.
