= Ł–l merger =

Phonological change in northeastern Kashubian

Ł–l merger (Kashubian: bëlaczenié; Polish: bylaczenie) is a phonological change in northeastern dialects of the Kashubian language, a merger of Ł into L. The Polish-language term is derived from the pronunciation of the words "béł", "bëła" (Polish: "był", "była", English: "was") as "bél", "bëla". The corresponding group of dialects is called gwary bylackie.

The merger is attributed to the historical language contact with Low German being more intensive than with Polish compared to other Kashubian dialects.

== See also ==
- L-vocalization#Polish and Sorbian (wałczenie)
