= L-vocalization =

Pronouncing "l" sounds as vowels

L-vocalization, in linguistics, is a process by which a lateral approximant sound such as [l], or, perhaps more often, velarized [ɫ], is replaced by a vowel or a semivowel.

== Types ==
There are two types of l-vocalization:

- A labiovelar approximant, velar approximant, or back vowel: [ɫ] > [w] or [ɰ] > [u] or [ɯ]
- A front vowel or palatal approximant: [l] > [j] > [i]

== West Germanic languages ==
Examples of L-vocalization can be found in many West Germanic languages, including English, Scots, Dutch, and some German dialects.

=== Early Modern English ===
L-vocalization has occurred, since Early Modern English, in certain -al- and -ol- sequences before coronal or velar consonants, or at the end of a word or morpheme. In these sequences, /al/ became /awl/ and then /ɑul/, while /ɔl/ became /ɔwl/ and then /ɔul/. Both of these merged with existing diphthongs: /ɑu/ as in law and /ɔu/ as in throw.

At the end of a word or morpheme, this produced /ɑul/ in all, ball, call, fall, gall, hall, mall, small, squall, stall, pall, tall, thrall and wall; /ɔul/ in control, droll, extol, knoll, poll (meaning a survey of people,) roll, scroll, stroll, swollen, toll, and troll. The word shall did not follow this trend, and remains /ʃæl/ today.

Before coronal consonants, this produced /ɑul/ in Alderney, alter, bald, balderdash, false, falter, halt, malt, palsy, salt, Wald and Walter; /ɔul/ in bold, cold, fold, gold, hold, molten, mould/mold, old, shoulder (earlier sholder), smolder, told, and wold (in the sense of "tract of land"). As with shall, the word shalt did not follow this trend, and remains /ʃælt/ today.

Before /k/, this produced /ɑul/ in balk, caulk/calk, chalk, Dundalk, falcon, stalk, talk and walk; /ɔul/ in folk, Polk, and yolk.

The Great Vowel Shift altered the pronunciation of the diphthongs, with /ɑu/ becoming the monophthong /ɔː/, and /ɔu/ raising to /oʊ/.

This L-vocalization established a pattern that would influence the spelling pronunciations of some relatively more recent loanwords like Balt, Malta, waltz, Yalta, and polder. It also influenced English spelling reform efforts, explaining the American English mold and molt vs. the traditional mould and moult.

Certain words of more recent origin or coining, however, do not have the change and retain short vowels, including Al, alcohol, bal, Cal, calcium, gal, Hal, mal-, pal, Sal, talc, Val, doll, Moll, and Poll (a nickname for a parrot.)

In -alk and -olk words, the /l/ subsequently disappeared entirely in most accents (with the notable exception of Hiberno-English). This change caused /ɑulk/ to become /ɑuk/, and /ɔulk/ to become /ɔuk/. Even outside Ireland, some of these words have more than one pronunciation that retains the /l/ sound, especially in American English where spelling pronunciations caused partial or full reversal of L-vocalization in a handful of cases:

- caulk/calk can be /ˈkɔːlk/ or /ˈkɔːk/.
- falcon can be /ˈfælkən/, /ˈfɒlkən/, /ˈfɔːlkən/ or /ˈfɔːkən/.
- yolk can be /ˈjoʊlk/ or /ˈjoʊk/. yoke as /ˈjoʊk/ is only conditionally homophonous.

Words like fault and vault did not undergo L-vocalization, but rather L-restoration, having previously been L-vocalized independently in Old French and lacking the /l/ in Middle English, but having it restored by Early Modern English. The word falcon existed simultaneously as homonyms fauco(u)n and falcon in Middle English. The word moult/molt never originally had /l/ to begin with, instead deriving from Middle English mout and related etymologically to mutate; the /l/ joined the word intrusively.

The loss of /l/ in words spelt with -alf, -alm, -alve and -olm did not involve L-vocalization in the same sense, but rather the elision of the consonant and usually the compensatory lengthening of the vowel.

=== Modern English ===
More extensive L-vocalization is a notable feature of certain dialects of English, including Cockney, Estuary English, New York English, New Zealand English, Pittsburgh English, Philadelphia English and Australian English, in which an /l/ sound occurring at the end of a word (but usually not when the next word begins with a vowel and is pronounced without a pause) or before a consonant is pronounced as some sort of close back vocoid: [w], [o] or [ʊ]. The resulting sound may not always be rounded. The precise phonetic quality varies. It can be heard occasionally in the dialect of the English East Midlands, where words ending in -old can be pronounced /oʊd/. K. M. Petyt (1985) noted this feature in the traditional dialect of West Yorkshire but said it has died out. However, in recent decades, l-vocalization has been spreading outwards from London and the southeast; John C. Wells (1982) argued that it is probable that it would become the standard pronunciation in England over the next one hundred years, which Petyt criticized in a book review.

For some speakers of the General American accent, /l/ before /f v/ (sometimes also before /s z/) may be pronounced as [ɤ̯].

In Cockney, Estuary English, New Zealand English and Australian English, l-vocalization can be accompanied by phonemic mergers of vowels before the vocalized /l/, so that real, reel and rill, which are distinct in most dialects of English, are homophones as [ɹɪw].

Graham Shorrocks noted extensive L-vocalization in the dialect of Bolton, Greater Manchester, and commented, "many, perhaps, associate such a quality more with Southern dialects, than with Lancashire/Greater Manchester."

In the accent of Bristol, syllabic /l/ can be vocalized to /o/, resulting in pronunciations like /ˈbɒto/ (for bottle). By hypercorrection, however, some words originally ending in /o/ were given an /l/: the original name of Bristol was Bristow, but this has been altered by hypercorrection to Bristol. In Plymouth L-vocalization is also found, but without turning into the Bristol L afterwards.

African-American English dialects may have L-vocalization as well. However, in these dialects, it may be omitted altogether: fool becomes [fuː]. Some English speakers from San Francisco, particularly those of Asian ancestry, also vocalize or omit /l/.

=== German ===
In colloquial varieties of modern standard German, including the northern Missingsch, there is a moderate tendency to vocalize coda /l/ into /ɪ̯/, especially in casual speech. This is most commonly found before /ç/ in words like welche ("which") or solche ("such"), which merges with Seuche ("disease"). To a lesser degree, the same may also occur before other dorsal and labial consonants.

A similar but far more regular development exists in many dialects of Austro-Bavarian, including Munich and Vienna. Here, etymological /l/ in the coda is vocalized into i or y in all cases. For example, Standard German viel ("much") corresponds to vui in Munich, vey in parts of the Southeast, vii North, West and East of Salzburg throughout the state of Salzburg, into Bavaria and into Upper Austria, especially well pronounced on the German side of the border, and vü in Viennese.

In most varieties of the Bernese dialect of Swiss German, historical /l/ in coda position has become [w] and historical /lː/ (only occurring intervocalically) has become [wː], whereas intervocalic /l/ persists. The absence of vocalization was one of the distinctive features of the now-uncommon upper-class variety. It is still missing from dialects spoken in the Bernese Highlands and, historically, in the Schwarzenburg area. For example, the Bernese German name of the city of Biel is pronounced [ˈb̥iə̯w].

This type of vocalization of /l/, such as [sɑwts] for Salz, is recently spreading into many Western Swiss German dialects, centred around Emmental.

=== Middle Scots ===
In early 15th century Middle Scots /al/ (except, usually, intervocalically and before /d/), /ol/ and often /ul/ changed to /au/, /ou/ and /uː/. For example, all changed to aw, colt to cowt, ful to fou (full) and the rare exception hald to haud (hold).

=== Middle Dutch ===
In early Middle Dutch, /ul/, /ol/ and /al/ merged and vocalized to /ou/ before a dental consonant (/d/ or /t/):

- schouder "shoulder" < schulder
- oud "old" < ald
- hout "wood" < holt
- Wouter, a name < Walter

The combination /ʏl/, which was derived from /ol/ or /ul/ through umlaut, was not affected by the change, which resulted in alternations that still survive in modern Dutch:

- goud "gold", but gulden "golden"
- schout "sheriff", but schuld "guilt, debt"
- zouden "would" < zolden, past tense of zullen "to will, shall"

Ablaut variations of the same root also caused alternations, with some forms preserving the /l/ and others losing it:

- houden "to hold", past tense hield
- wouden "wanted" < wolden, past tense of willen "to want"

Analogy has caused it to be restored in some cases, however:

- wilden reformed next to older wouden
- gelden "to apply", past tense golden, earlier gouden

=== Modern Dutch ===
Many speakers of the northern accents of Dutch realize /l/ in the syllable coda as a strongly pharyngealized vowel [ɤ̯ˤ].

L-vocalization increased significantly from 1957, especially among women and people from Holland and Utrecht areas.

In some dialects, instead of vocalization, it is more common to pronounce a clearer [ə] (a Svarabhakti vocal) after a vowel followed by a [l] or [r]: melk (milk) becomes [mel·ək].

== Romance languages ==
=== French ===
In pre-Modern French, [l] vocalized to [u] in certain positions:

- between a vowel and a consonant, as in Vulgar Latin caldu(m) "warm, hot" > Old French chaud /tʃaut/
- after a vowel at the end of a word, as in Vulgar Latin bellu(m) > Old French bel > Old French beau /be̯au̯/ "beautiful" (masculine singular; compare the feminine belle /bɛlə/, in which the l occurred between vowels and did not vocalize)

By another sound change, diphthongs resulting from L-vocalization were simplified to monophthongs:

- Modern French chaud [ʃo]
- Modern French beau [bo] (belle [bɛl])

=== Italo-Romance languages ===
In early Italian, /l/ vocalized between a preceding consonant and a following vowel to /j/: Latin florem > Italian fiore, Latin clavem > Italian chiave.

Extreme Southern Italian and Southern Italo-Romance languages show a pattern similar to French.

In Neapolitan [l] is vocalized, especially after [a]. For example, vulgar Latin altu > àutə; alter > àutə; calza > cauzètta (with diminutive suffix). In many areas the vocalized [l] has evolved further into a syllabic [v], thus àvətə, cavəzetta.

In Sicilian [l] is vocalized if preceded by [a] and followed by a consonant. For example, vulgar Latin altu > autu; alter > autru; saltus > sautu. It is regular in some areas the emerging of and epenthetic syllable after the vocalization of [l], yielding into a new syllable [β], thus àβʊtʊ, àβʊʈɽʊ. Other minor Sicilian dialects, such as Southern-Western Agrigentino, have undergone instead a divergent development of nasalization, starting from [l] sound, so that the formers became: altu > antu; alter > antru; saltus > santu.

=== Ibero-Romance languages ===
West Iberian languages such as Spanish and Portuguese had similar changes to those of French, but they were less common: Latin alter became autro and later otro (Spanish) or outro (Portuguese), while caldus remained caldo, and there were also some less regular shifts, like vultur to buitre (Spanish) or abutre (Portuguese).

In Portuguese, historical [ɫ] (/l/ in the syllable coda) has become [u̯ ~ ʊ̯] for most Brazilian dialects, and it is common in rural communities of Alto Minho and Madeira. For those dialects, the words mau (adjective, "bad") and mal (adverb, "poorly", "badly") are homophones and both pronounced as [ˈmaw]~[ˈmaʊ], while standard European Portuguese prescribes [ˈmaɫ]. The pair is distinguished only by the antonyms (bom [ˈbõ]~[ˈbõw] and bem [ˈbẽj]).

== Slavic languages ==
=== South Slavic languages ===
In Standard Serbo-Croatian, historical /l/ in coda position has become /o/ and is now so spelled at all times in Serbian and most often in Croatian. For example, the native name of Belgrade is Beograd (Croatia also has a town of Biograd). However, in some final positions and in nouns only, Croatian keeps the /l/ by analogy with other forms: stol, vol, sol vs. Serbian sto, vo, so (meaning "table", "ox" and "salt" respectively). This does not apply to adjectives (topao) or past participles of verbs (stigao), which are the same in Standard Croatian as in Standard Serbian.

In Slovene, historical coda /l/ is still spelled as l but almost always pronounced as [w].

In Bulgarian, the phoneme /ɫ/ is pronounced as a labio-velar approximant [w] in all positions in certain urban dialects, particularly among young people. For example, words such as лодка, малка (boat, small) are pronounced [ˈwɔtkɐ], [ˈmawkɐ]. This feature is also associated with certain traditional dialects, mostly around Pernik, though it is thought that it evolved independently in the rest of the country. Still, it is more widespread in western dialects.

=== Polish and Sorbian ===
In Polish and Sorbian languages, almost all historical /ɫ/ have become /w/, even in word-initial and inter-vocalic positions. For example, mały ("small" in both Polish and Sorbian) is pronounced by most speakers as [ˈmawɨ] (compare Russian малый [ˈmalɨj]). The [w] pronunciation, called wałczenie in Polish, dates back to the 16th century, first appearing among the lower classes. It was considered an uncultured accent until the mid-20th century, when the stigma gradually began to fade. As of the 21st century, [ɫ] is still used by some speakers of eastern Polish dialects, especially in Belarus and Lithuania, as well as in Polish-Czech and Polish-Slovak contact dialects in southern Poland.

=== Ukrainian and Belarusian ===
In Ukrainian and Belarusian, in the syllable coda, historical /ɫ/ has become [w] (written ⟨в⟩ in Ukrainian and ⟨ў⟩ in Belarusian, now commonly analyzed as coda allophone of /ʋ/–/v/). For example, the Ukrainian and Belarusian word for "wolf" is вовк [ʋɔwk] and воўк [vowk] as opposed to Russian вoлк [voɫk]. The same happens in the past tense of verbs: Russian дал [daɫ], Ukrainian дав [daw], Belarusian даў [daw] "gave". The /ɫ/ is kept at the end of nouns (Russian and Belarusian стoл [stoɫ], Ukrainian стіл [stiɫ] "table") and before suffixes (before historical ⟨ъ⟩ in the word middle): Russian, Ukrainian, and Belarusian палка [ˈpaɫka] "stick".

== Uralic languages ==
Proto-Uralic *l was vocalized to *j in several positions in the Proto-Samoyed language. Several modern Uralic languages also exhibit l-vocalization:

- In Hungarian, former palatal lateral *ʎ (still written by a separate grapheme ly) has become a semivowel /j/.
  - A similar phenomenon exists in Swedish, where initial */lj/ (written by lj) has also become /j/ (this does not apply to Swedish spoken in Finland).
- Most Zyrian dialects of Komi vocalize syllable-final /l/ in various ways, which may result in [v], [u], or vowel length.
- Veps also vocalizes original syllable-final *l to /u/.

== See also ==
- Ł–l merger
- Regional accents of English
- Ł
- Lambdacism
