= Swiss Film Awards =

National film award of Switzerland

- Awarded for: Films
- Country: Switzerland
- Presented by: Swiss Film Academy
- First award: 1998
- Website: https://www.swissfilmaward.ch

The Swiss Film Awards (French: Prix du cinéma suisse, German: Schweizer Filmpreis, Italian: Premio del cinema svizzero, Romansh: Premi dal film svizzer; also known as the Swiss Film Prize) are national film awards awarded in several categories of Switzerland, first given out in 1998.

== History ==
Between 1998 and 2008 the prize was given during the Solothurn Film Festival in the Konzertsaal/Reithalle in Solothurn. From 2009 to 2012 it was held in Lucerne, and since then it has been held in a different city each year, apart from 2020, when it had to be cancelled owing to the COVID-19 pandemic. In that year, the winners were announced in a special programme and are supposed to be presented as part of the annual Locarno Film Festival in August.

From 2009 onwards the festival has hosted the "Night of Nominations" announcement. Since then, every nomination film receives a cash prize. Also since 2009, the ceremony has been moved to March in a more glamorous atmosphere and with a broadcasting on television. 2009 was the last year where the jury was composed of people from the Swiss state and the Federal Office of Culture. Until that year, the award was called "Viewfinder" and changed its appearance every year with different designers being approached to give it a distinctive look. Since 2009 the prize awarded is a Cristal-like statue, designed by Alfredo Häberli, called "The Quartz".

From 2010 the prizes were awarded by the Swiss Film Academy. As of 2024, they are awarded by the Federal Office of Culture.

== Categories ==
In 2024, an honorary award was awarded to producer Robert Boner, who has produced more than 50 films, including Les petites fugues (1979) by Yves Yersin, films by Christine Pascal and Lionel Baier, and many documentaries and animated films.

=== Current ===
- Best Actor
- Best Actress
- Best Animation Film
- Best Documentary Film
- Best Fiction Film
- Best Short Film
- Best Performance in a Supporting Role
- Best Screenplay
- Best Cinematography
- Best Film Editing
- Best Film Score
- Special Jury Prize

=== Retired awards ===
- Best Performance in a Leading Role (2004-2007)
- Best Emerging Actor or Actress (2008-2010)

== Ceremonies ==
Edition	Date	Host(s)	Venue	Best Film
1st	21 January 1998		Konzertsaal, Solothurn	ex-aequo: The Silence of Men & Waalo Fendo - Là où la terre gèle
2nd	27 January 1999	Monika Schärer	Konzertsaal, Solothurn	Fögi Is a Bastard
3rd	19 January 2000	Florence Heiniger	Konzertsaal, Solothurn	Set Me Free
4th	24 January 2001	Monika Schärer & Thierry Romanens	Konzertsaal, Solothurn	Azzurro
5th	16 January 2002		Rythalle, Solothurn	Utopia Blues
6th	22 January 2003	Florence Heiniger & Max Rüdlinger	Rythalle, Solothurn	On dirait le sud
7h	21 January 2004	Florence Heiniger & Polo Hofer	Rythalle, Solothurn	Mein Name ist Bach
8th	26 January 2005	Esther Gemsch & Massimo Lorenzi	Rythalle, Solothurn	One Long Winter Without Fire
9th	18 January 2006	Massimo Lorenzi & Eva Wannemacher	Rythalle, Solothurn	Rascals on the Road
10th	24 January 2007	Gilles Tschudi	Konzertsaal, Solothurn	Vitus
11th	23 January 2008	Susanne Kunz	CIS Sportscenter, Solothurn	The Friend
12th	7 March 2009	Susanne Kunz	KKL Lucerne	Home
13th	6 March 2010	Susanne Kunz	KKL Lucerne	Cœur animal
14th	12 March 2011	Susanne Kunz	KKL Lucerne	The Little Bedroom
15th	17 March 2012	Susanne Kunz	KKL Lucerne	Summer Games
16th	23 March 2013	Fabienne Hadorn & Alain Croubalian	Bâtiment des Forces Motrices, Geneva	Sister
17th	21 March 2014	Maria Victoria Haas	Schiffbau, Zurich	I Am the Keeper
18th	13 March 2015	Maria Victoria Haas	Bâtiment des Forces Motrices, Geneva	The Circle
19th	21 March 2016	Maria Victoria Haas	Schiffbau, Zurich	Köpek
20th	24 March 2017	Maria Victoria Haas	Bâtiment des Forces Motrices, Geneva	My Life as a Courgette
21st	23 March 2018	Monika Schärer	Halle 622, Oerlikon, Zurich	Blue My Mind
22nd	22 March 2019	Maria Victoria Haas	Bâtiment des Forces Motrices, Geneva	Ceux qui travaillent
23rd	24 March 2020	—N/a	Locarno Film Festival	Le milieu de l’horizon
24th	26 March 2021	—N/a	Online Event	My Little Sister
25th	25 March 2022	—N/a	Zurich	Olga
26th	24 March 2023	—N/a	Geneva	Drii Winter
27th	22 March 2024	—N/a	Zurich	Blackbird blackberry

== See also ==
- Austrian Film Award
- German Film Award
