= Swiss people =

- Flag of Switzerland, a federal symbol used to represent all Swiss citizens

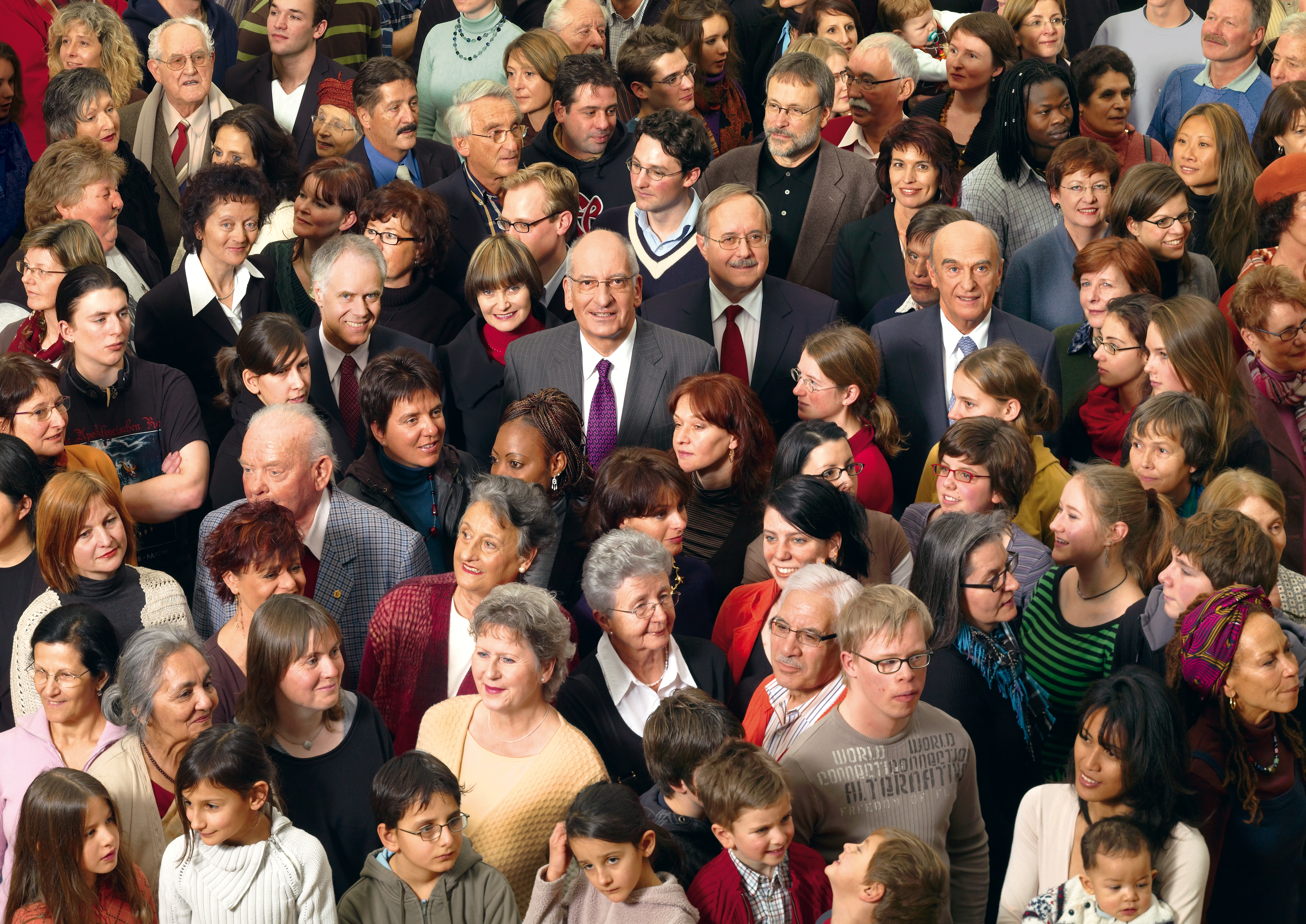
- Official photo of the Federal Council (2008, 7+1 people looking straight into the lens), idealized depiction of a multi-ethnic Swiss society.

Total population
- c. 11–12 million (2023) (Note: Collectively the 9.7 million citizens plus the estimated figure of 1.5 million non-citizens abroad with self-reported Swiss ancestry.)

Regions with significant populations
- Switzerland 8.9 million (2023)
- Swiss abroad: 0.8 million (2023)
- Swiss ancestry: c. 1.5 million
- France: 209,287
- Germany: 99,582
- United States: 83,667
- Italy: 51,964
- Canada: 41,463
- United Kingdom: 40,183
- Australia: 35,629
- Spain: 26,499
- Uruguay: 25,000
- Israel: 23,670
- Austria: 18,350
- Argentina: 15,120
- Philippines: 13,777
- Brazil: 13,611
- Thailand: 10,414
- Netherlands: 10,195
- Belgium: 8,651
- South Africa: 7,743
- New Zealand: 7,345
- Portugal: 6,916
- Sweden: 6,601
- Chile: 5,730
- Turkey: 5,405
- Mexico: 5,289
- Liechtenstein: 4,878
- Denmark: 3,720
- United Arab Emirates: 3,452
- Serbia: 3,446
- Greece: 3,048
- Norway: 2,956
- Poland: 2,907
- Peru: 2,884
- China: 2,564
- Colombia: 2,348
- Hungary: 2,229
- South Korea: 1,572
- Japan: 1,306

Languages
- Languages of Switzerland: Swiss German; Swiss French; Swiss Italian

Religion
- Catholicism, Calvinism, Atheism

Related ethnic groups
- Other Germanic and Romance peoples

The Swiss people (German: die Schweizer, French: les Suisses, Italian: gli Svizzeri, Romansh: ils Svizzers) are the citizens of the multi-ethnic Swiss Confederation (Switzerland) regardless of ethno-cultural background (Note: The term is sometimes extended to include the descendants of Swiss emigrants, see e.g. "Swiss". New Oxford American Dictionary. Conversely, Swiss nationality law employs a restrictive form of jus sanguinis policy, i.e. only children or protégés of Swiss citizens are given citizenship upon birth; children born in the country to foreign citizens are subject to naturalisation. There are three levels of alien citizens in Switzerland, which means there are numerous second-generation legal aliens who are technically "natives of Switzerland" without being Swiss citizens.) or people of self-identified Swiss ancestry.

The number of Swiss nationals has grown from 1.7 million in 1815 to 8.7 million in 2020. More than 1.5 million Swiss citizens hold multiple citizenship. About 11% of citizens live abroad (0.8 million, of whom 0.6 million hold multiple citizenship). About 60% of those living abroad reside in the European Union (0.46 million). The largest groups of Swiss descendants and nationals outside Europe are found in the United States, Brazil, and Canada.

Switzerland is home to a people of a variety of origins, itself being a multi-racial and multi-cultural country. The Swiss are not a single ethnic group, Rather, Switzerland is a confederacy (Eidgenossenschaft) or Willensnation ("nation of will", "nation by choice", that is, a consociational state), a term coined in contrast to "nation" in the conventional linguistic or ethnic sense.

The demonym Swiss (formerly in English also called Switzer) and the name of Switzerland ultimately derive from the toponym Schwyz. Both have been widely used to refer to the Old Swiss Confederacy since the 16th century.

== Ethno-linguistic composition ==
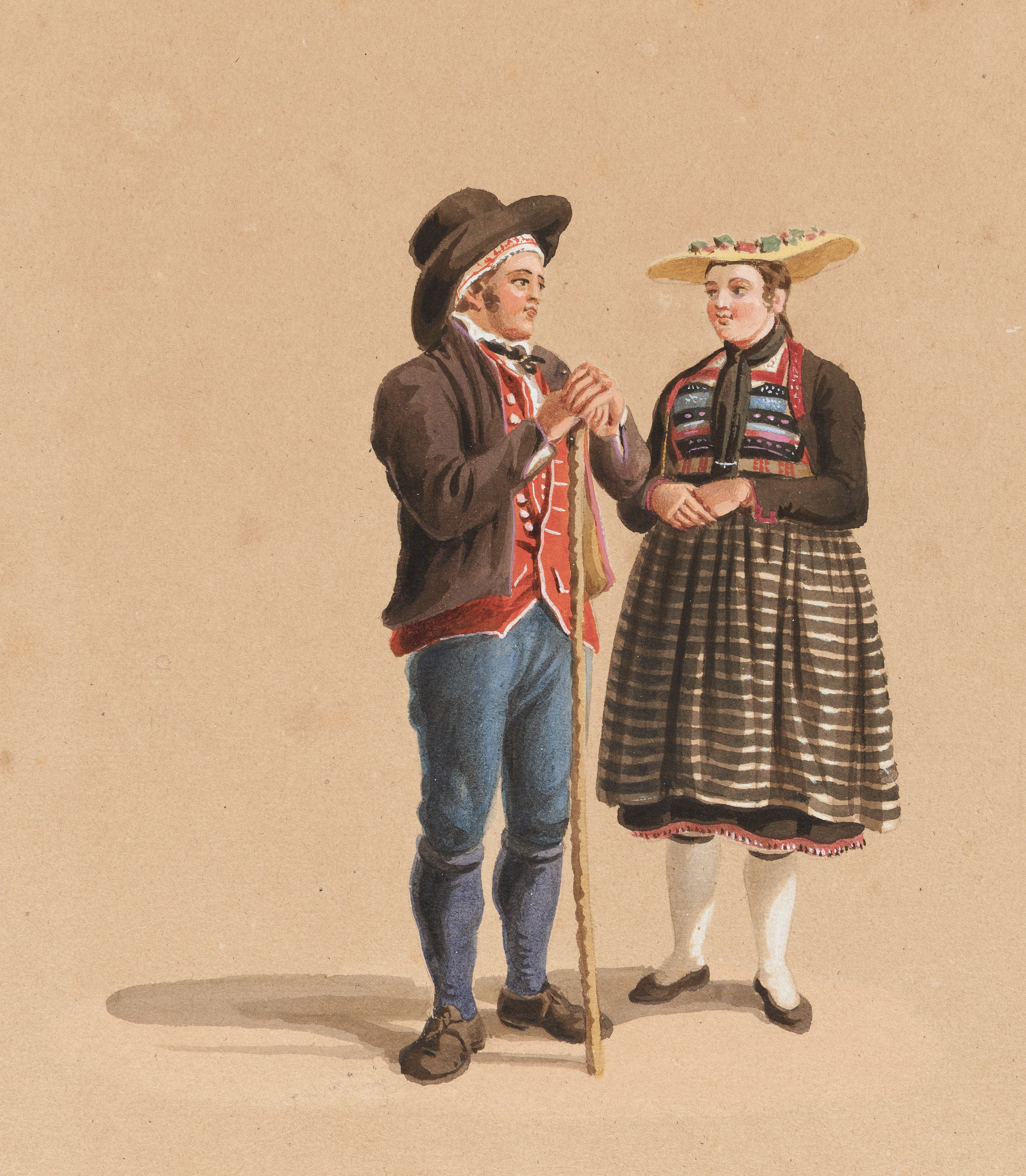
Man and woman of Entlebuch (Gabriel Lory, early 19th century)

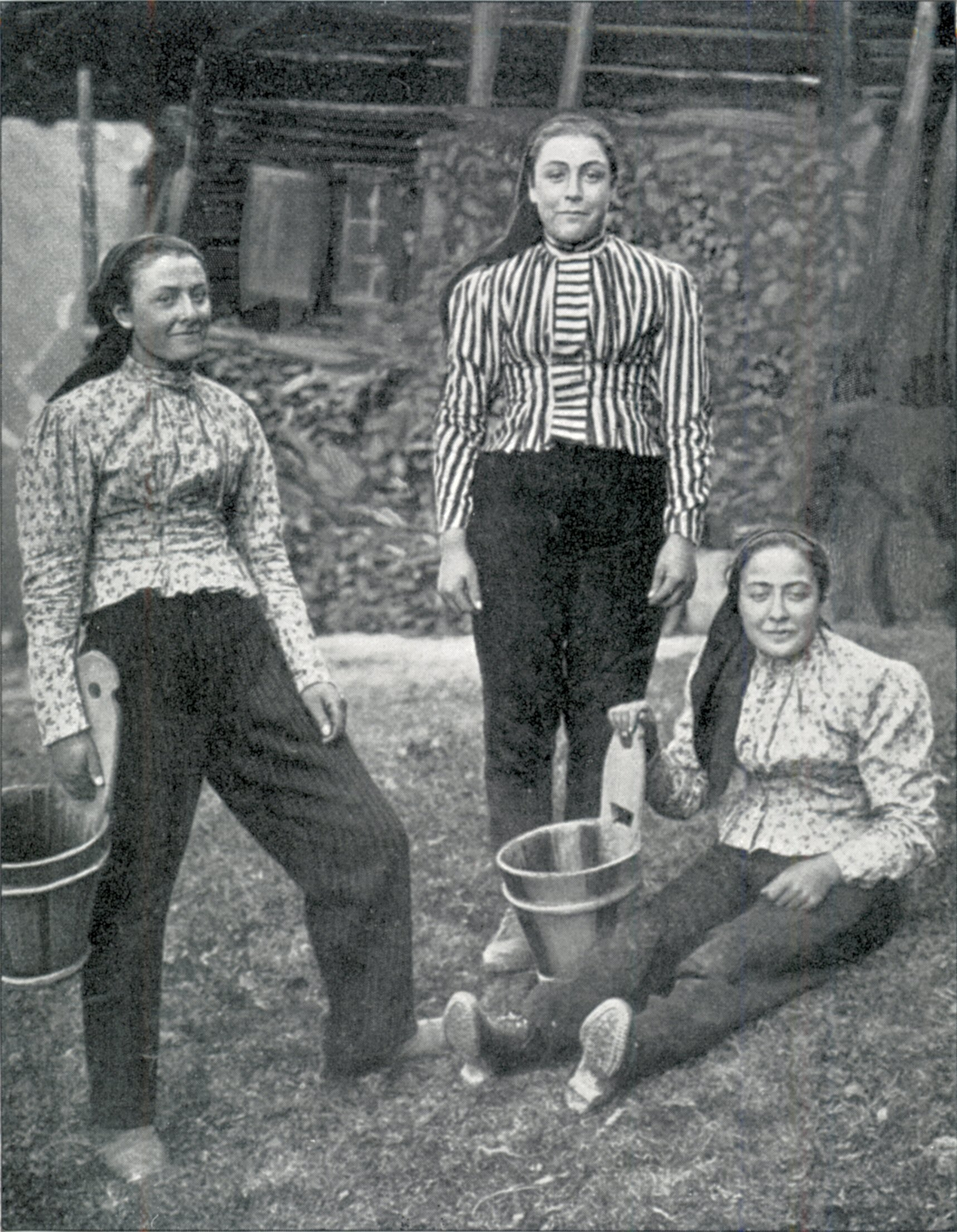
Farmers of Champery, Valais (1904 photograph)

The ethno-linguistic composition of the territories of modern Switzerland includes the following components:

- The German Swiss (Deutschschweizer) are mostly speakers of different varieties of Alemannic German. They are historically amalgamated from the Gallo-Roman population, consisting mostly of romanized Helvetii, Raurici, Roman immigrants and the Alemanni. Closely related German-speaking peoples are the Alsatians, the Swabians and the Vorarlbergians. German speakers (including German and Austrian immigrants) accounted for 62.3% of the population as of 2020.
  - Speakers of High Alemannic, roughly divided into an Eastern (Zürich, Lake Lucerne, Eastern Switzerland) and a Western (Bernese, Solothurn, Western Aargau, Basel-Land and Fricktal) subgroup, with most dialects of Aargau and Lucerne transitional between the groups.
  - Speakers of Low Alemannic in Basel and the Lake Constance area.
  - Speakers of Highest Alemannic in the Bernese Oberland, Upper Valais and the Walser settlements in Central Switzerland, Grisons and Ticino.
- The French-speaking Swiss (Romands), traditionally speaking Franco-Provençal dialects (as well as the Franc-Comtois dialect of the Oïl languages in parts of Jura), today largely assimilated to the standard French language (Swiss French), amalgamated from the Gallo-Roman population and Burgundians (the historical Upper Burgundy). Romands are considered a distinct Romance people. They are closely related to the French populations of Franche-Comté and Rhône-Alpes. They are referred to as Welsche (singular Welsche f./Welscher m.) in (Swiss) German. French speakers (including French immigrants) accounted for 22.8% of population as of 2020.
- The Italian-speaking Swiss (Svizzeri italiani, see also Swiss Italian), traditionally speakers of Lombard language (Ticinese varieties, as well as the dialects of the Bregaglia, Poschiavo and Mesolcina valleys in Grisons) today partly assimilated to the standard Italian language, amalgamated from Raetians and Lombards. They are closely related to the population of Northern Italy, especially Lombards. Italian speakers (including Italian immigrants) accounted for 8% of population as of 2020.
- The Romansh, speakers of the Romansh language, settling in parts of the Grisons, historically of Raetic stock. Romansh speakers accounted for about 0.5% of population as of 2020.

The core Eight Cantons of the Swiss Confederacy were entirely Alemannic-speaking, and German speakers remain the majority. However, from as early as the 15th century, parts of French-speaking Vaud and Italian-speaking Ticino were acquired as subject territories by Bern and Uri, respectively. The Swiss Romandie was formed by the accession of French-speaking Geneva and Neuchâtel and the partly francophone Valais and Bernese Jura (formerly part of the Prince-Bishopric of Basel) to the Restored Swiss Confederacy in 1815. Romansh was formerly considered a group of Italian dialects, but Switzerland declared Romansh a national language in 1938 in reaction to the fascist Italian irredentism at the time.

Switzerland experienced significant immigration from Italy in the very late 19th and early 20th century, such that in 1910 that accounted for some 10% of the Swiss population. This immigration was halted by the Great Depression and WWII. It restarted after the war ended. As elsewhere in Western Europe, immigration to Switzerland has increased dramatically since the 1960s, so that a large proportion of the resident population of Switzerland are now not descended or only partially descended from the core ethno-linguistic groups listed above.

As of 2011, 37% of total resident population of Switzerland had immigrant background. As of 2016, the most widely used foreign languages were English, Portuguese, Albanian, Serbo-Croatian and Spanish, all named as a "main language" by more than 2% of total population (respondents could name more than one "main language").

Chestnut harvest in Ticino (1906)

== Cultural history and national identity ==
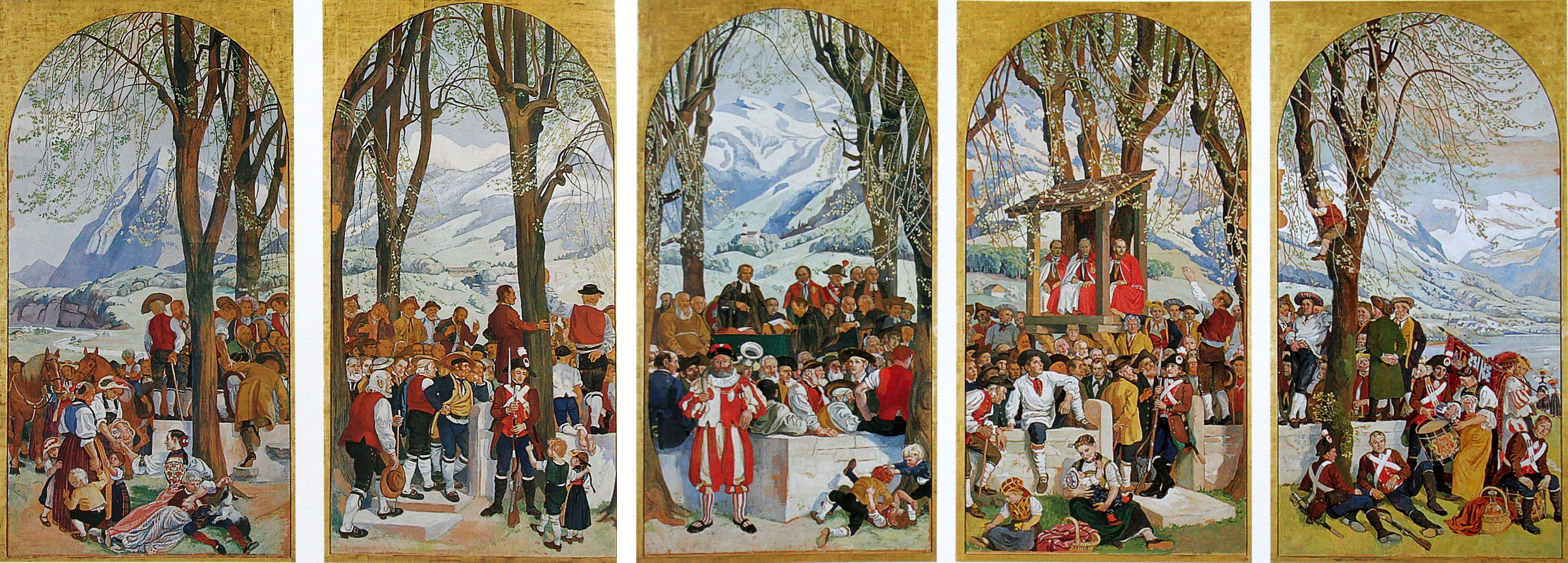
Landsgemeinde by Wilhelm Balmer and Albert Welti (1907–1914); an idealized National Romantic depiction of Swiss population and society.

The Swiss populace historically derives from an amalgamation of Gallic (most significant the Helvetians) or Gallo-Roman, Alamannic and Rhaetic stock. Their cultural history is dominated by the Alps, and the alpine environment is often cited as an important factor in the formation of the Swiss national character. For example, the "Swiss illness", the condition of Swiss mercenaries pining for their mountainous native home, became prototypical of the medical condition of nostalgia ("homesickness") described in the 17th century.

In early modern Switzerland, the Swiss Confederacy was a pact between independent states within the Holy Roman Empire. The populations of the states of Central Switzerland considered themselves ethnically or even racially separate: Martin Zeiller in Topographia Germaniae (1642) reports a racial division even within the canton of Unterwalden, the population of Obwalden being identified as "Romans", and that of Nidwalden as "Cimbri" (viz. Germanic), while the people of Schwyz were identified as of Swedish ancestry, and the people of Uri were identified as "Huns or Goths".

Modern Switzerland is atypical in its successful political integration of a multiethnic and multilingual populace, and is often cited as a model for new efforts at creating unification, as in the European Union's frequent invocation of the Swiss Confederate model. Because the various populations of Switzerland share language, ethnicity, and religion not with each other but with the major European powers between whom Switzerland during the modern history of Europe found itself positioned, a policy of domestic plurality in conjunction with international neutrality became a matter of self-preservation. Consequently, the Swiss elites during the period of the formation of nation states throughout Europe did not attempt to impose a national language or a nationalism based on ethnicity, instead pushing for the creation of a civic nation grounded in democratic ideology, common political institutions, and shared political ritual. Political allegiance and patriotism was directed towards the cantons, not the federal level, where a spirit of rivalry and competition rather than unity prevailed. C. G. Jung advanced the view that this system of social order was one of a "chronic state of mitigated civil war" which put Switzerland ahead of the world in a civilizatory process of "introverting" warlike aggression. A similar view is attributed to Gottfried Keller, who is cited to the effect that the Swiss Confederacy could not exist without the endemic rivalry between cantons.

From the 19th century onwards, there were conscious attempts to foster a federal "Pan-Swiss" national identity that would replace or alleviate the cantonal patriotisms. Among the traditions enlisted to this end were federal sharpshooting competitions, or tirs. These competitions were one of the few recognized symbols of pan-Swiss identity prior to the creation of the 1815 Confederation and traditionally involved men from all levels of society, including the peasants, who in Romantic nationalism had become ideologically synonymous with liberty and nationhood. The Swiss national holiday, introduced in 1889, was another symbol of national identity at the federal level. The bonfires associated with the national holiday have become so customary since then that they have displaced the Funken traditions of greater antiquity.

Identification with the national symbolism relating to the Old Swiss Confederacy was especially difficult for the cantons which had been joined to the Helvetic Republic in 1798 without any prior membership in the Swiss Confederacy, and which were given the status of Swiss cantons only after the end of the Napoleonic era. These specifically include Grisons, Valais, Ticino, Vaud, and Geneva. St. Gallen is a special case in a different sense, being a conglomerate of various historical regions created in 1803; in this case, patriotism may attach itself even to sub-cantonal entities, such as the Toggenburg. Similarly, due to the historical imperialism of the canton of Bern, there is considerable irredentism within the Bernese lands, most visibly in the Bernese Jura but to a lesser extent also in parts of the Bernese Oberland such as Hasli.

== Citizenship and naturalization ==
Swiss citizenship is still primarily citizenship in one of the Swiss cantons, and the naturalization of foreign citizens is the privilege of the cantons.

No Swiss passports were issued prior to 1915, more than 60 years after the establishment of the modern Swiss Confederation. Prior to 1915, citizens held passports issued by their cantons, the Confederation being considered as a federation of the cantons, not a state composed of natural persons as its citizens.

The Swiss Constitution of 1848 regulated certain rights that the cantons were required to grant to citizens of other cantons, such as the right of residence (in the case of naturalized citizens after a period of five years). The Swiss Constitution of 1874, which remained in force (with revisions) until 1999, defined Swiss citizenship as inherited from cantonal citizenship: Jeder Kantonsbürger ist Schweizer Bürger ("every citizen of a canton is a Swiss citizen"). In the preamble to the current Swiss Constitution of 1999, a "Swiss People" (Schweizervolk) is invoked alongsides "the Cantons" as sovereign entity, and article 1 reads "The People and the Cantons [...] form the Swiss Confederation." Article 37 still defines Swiss citizenship as inherited from communal and cantonal citizenship: "Any person who is a citizen of a commune and of the Canton to which that commune belongs is a Swiss citizen." As Swiss citizenship is entirely based on jus sanguinis, the place of origin rather than the place of birth is recorded in identity documents. As Swiss citizenship is tied to the cantonal citizenship associated with the "place of origin" (Heimatort or Bürgerort "home commune, commune of citizenship"), a citizen's place of origin is inherited from their father (from the mother if born out of wedlock or if the father holds no citizenship). The significance of the place of origin outside of the naturalization procedure has been gradually abolished in the early 21st century. Since 2012, the municipality or canton of a citizen's place of origin is no longer responsible for providing social welfare to that citizen. Since 2013, a woman no longer acquires the place of origin of her husband upon marriage.

While the cantons are responsible for naturalization, federal Swiss nationality law regulates minimal requirements necessary for naturalization. These requirements were significantly reduced in a 2018 revision of the law, allowing naturalization after a minimal period of residence of ten years, and in certain cases as little as five years (naturalization of spouses and children of Swiss citizens; years of residence at ages 8 to 18 count double). A further requirement is that the applicant be "well integrated" and "familiar with life in Switzerland", and must have both oral and written competence in one of the national languages of Switzerland. The federal law just specifies minimal requirements for naturalization, and cantons are free to introduce more stringent requirements. In practice, the cantons delegate the actual procedure of naturalization to the communes.

With 25% of the population resident aliens, Switzerland has one of the highest ratios of non-naturalized inhabitants in Europe (comparable to the Netherlands; roughly twice the ratio of Germany). In 2003, 35,424 residents were naturalized, a number exceeding net population growth. Over the 25-year period of 1983 to 2007, 479,264 resident foreigners were naturalized, yearly numbers rising gradually from below 10,000 (0.1%) in the 1980s to above 40,000 (0.6%) in the 2000s. Compare the figure of 0.2% (140,795) in the United Kingdom (2004).

== Genetics ==
The genetic composition of the Swiss population is similar to that of Central Europe in general. On the one hand, Switzerland at the crossroads of several prehistoric migrations; on the other hand, the Alps acted as a refuge in some cases. Genetic studies found the following haplogroups to be prevalent:

- Y-DNA: R1b, E3b, I1b2, R1a, J

Haplogroup R1b-U152 also known as R1b-S28 is the frequent haplogroup of Swiss people, followed by R1b-U106/R1b-S21.

- mtDNA: H 28% (HV 33%), U4+U5 (14%), K (7%), J (5%)

== See also ==
- Brünig-Napf-Reuss line
- Demographics of Switzerland
- List of Swiss people
- Women in Switzerland
- Röstigraben
- Swiss migration to France
- Swiss nationality law
- Swiss abroad
- Swiss Americans
- Swiss Mexicans

== Bibliography ==
- Walter Sorell, The Swiss: A cultural panorama of Switzerland. Bobbs-Merrill, 1972.
- Heinrich Zschokke, Des Schweizerlands Geschichten für das Schweizervolk, J. J. Mäcken, 1823. Internet Archive, trans. as The History of Switzerland, for the Swiss People by Francis George Shaw, 1855. Google Books
- Frank Webb, Switzerland of the Swiss, Scribners, 1910. Archive.org
- Paul Bilton, The Xenophobe's Guide to the Swiss, Oval Projects Ltd, 1999. Internet Archive
- Leo Schelbert, Swiss Migration to America: The Swiss Mennonites, Ayer Publishing, 1980.
- John Paul Von Grueningen, The Swiss In The United States: A Compilation Prepared for the Swiss-American Historical Society as the Second Volume of Its Publications, Swiss-American Historical Society, 1940, reprinted for Clearfield Co. by Genealogical Pub. Co., 2005, ISBN 978-0-8063-5265-7.
- Henry Demarest Lloyd, John Atkinson Hobson, The Swiss democracy: The Study of a Sovereign People, T. F. Unwin, 1908.
- J. Christopher Herold, The Swiss without Halos, Greenwood Press, 1979.
- Julie Hartley-Moore, The Song of Gryon: Political Ritual, Local Identity, and the Consolidation of Nationalism in Multiethnic Switzerland, Journal of American Folklore 120.476 (2007) 204–229.
- Arnold Henry Moore Lunn, The Swiss and their Mountains: A Study of the Influence of Mountains on Man, Rand McNally, 1963.
- Hans Kohn, Nationalism and Liberty: The Swiss Example. London: George Allen and Unwin, 1956.
- Marcello Sorce Keller, "Transplanting multiculturalism: Swiss musical traditions reconfigured in multicultural Victoria", in Joel Crotti and Kay Dreyfus (Guest Editors), Victorian Historical Journal, LXXVIII(2007), no. 2, pp. 187–205; later appeared in Bulletin - Schweizerische Gesellschaft für Musikethnologie und Gesellschaft für die Volksmusik in der Schweiz, October 2008, pp. 53–63.
