= Welti =

Welti is a German surname:

- Albert Welti (1862–1912), Swiss painter and etcher
- Albert J. Welti (1894–1965), Swiss painter and writer
- Emil Welti (1825–1899), Swiss politician and father-in-law of Lydia Welti-Escher
- Émilie Jeanne-Sophie Welti, known as Sophie Hunger (born 1983), Swiss singer-songwriter
- Lydia Welti-Escher (1858–1891), Swiss patron of the arts and founder of the Gottfried Keller Stiftung
