= Fritz Schider =

Austrian painter (1846–1907)

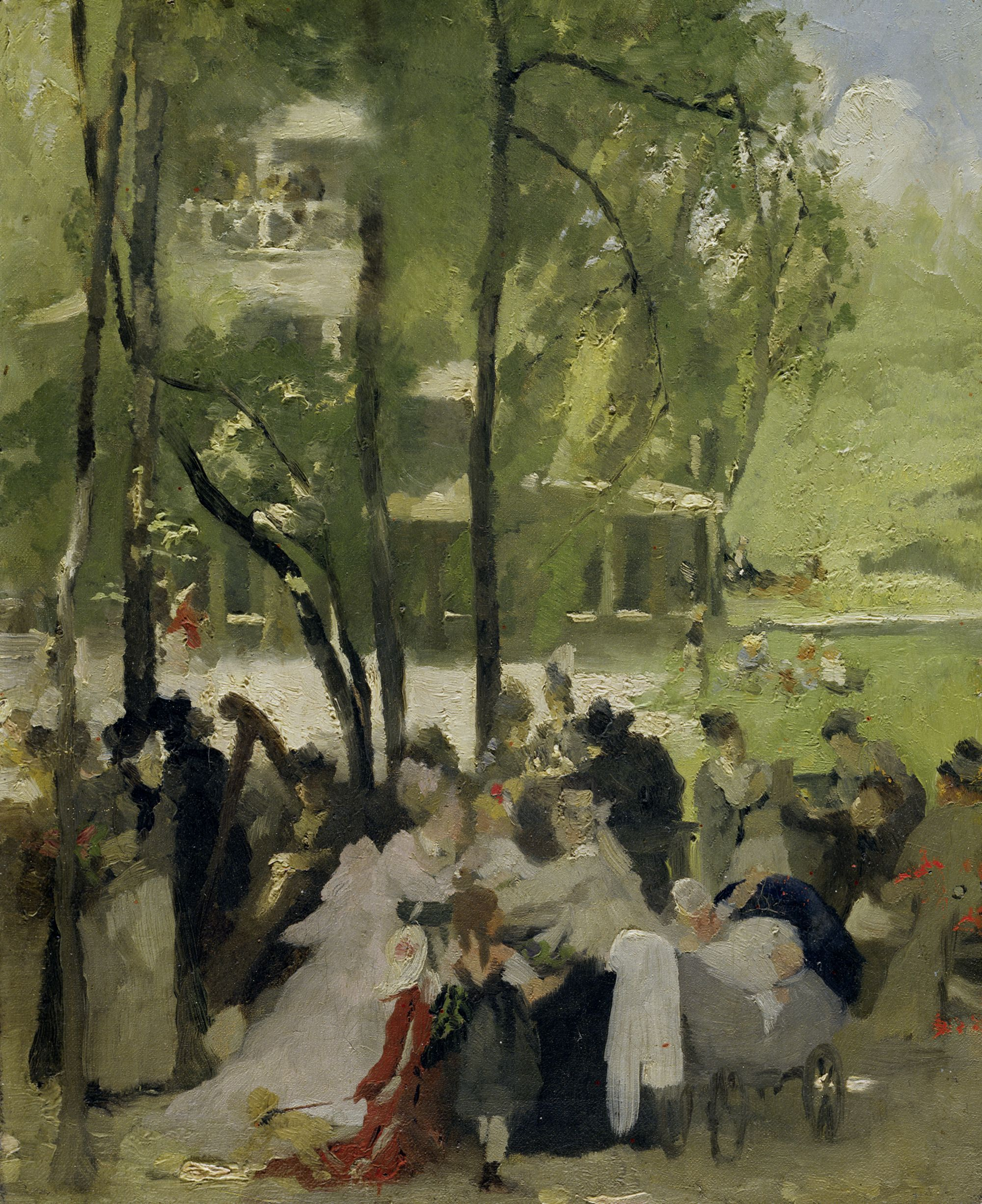
The Chinese Tower of Munich

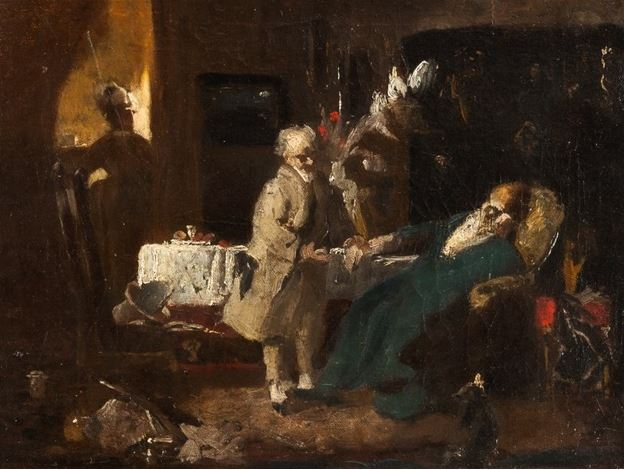
The Doctor's Visit, or The Imaginary Illness

Fritz Schider or Schieder (13 February 1846, Salzburg - 15 March 1907, Basel) was an Austrian painter, engraver and art teacher.

== Biography ==
He was born to a middle-class family of manufacturers. After completing his basic education, he entered the Bergakademie (Mining School) in Leoben. By 1865, he had decided to pursue a career as an artist and enrolled at the Academy of Fine Arts Vienna. There, he studied with Alexander von Wagner, Arthur von Ramberg and Wilhelm von Lindenschmit.

A year later, he accompanied his friend Hans Makart to Munich and entered Academy of Fine Arts there. At that time, he came under the influence of Wilhelm Leibl and joined the artists' group known as the Leibl-Kreis. He was also an admirer of Theodor Alt and the early works of Albert von Keller. In 1877, he married Lina Kirchdorffer (1854–1927), one of Leibl's nieces.

In 1876, he accepted an offer from the "Gesellschaft für das Gute und Gemeinnützige" in Basel and became a teacher at the company's drawing and modeling school. His students there included Burkhard Mangold, Wilhelm Balmer, Max Buri, Numa Donzé and Carl Burckhardt. He was also employed by Julius Kollmann to help him with his Plastische Anatomie des menschlichen Körpers. Ein Handbuch für Künstler und Kunstfreunde (Anatomy for Artists). He later created his own large anatomy atlas, Plastisch-anatomische Studien für Akademien, Kunstgewerbeschulen und zum Selbstunterricht, which was published in installments from 1891 to 1894.

In 1885, he became a citizen of Basel. For his anatomical work with Kollmann, and independently, he was named an Honorary Doctor in the medical faculty at the University of Basel in 1896.
