= Chinese Tower =

Building in Munich, Germany

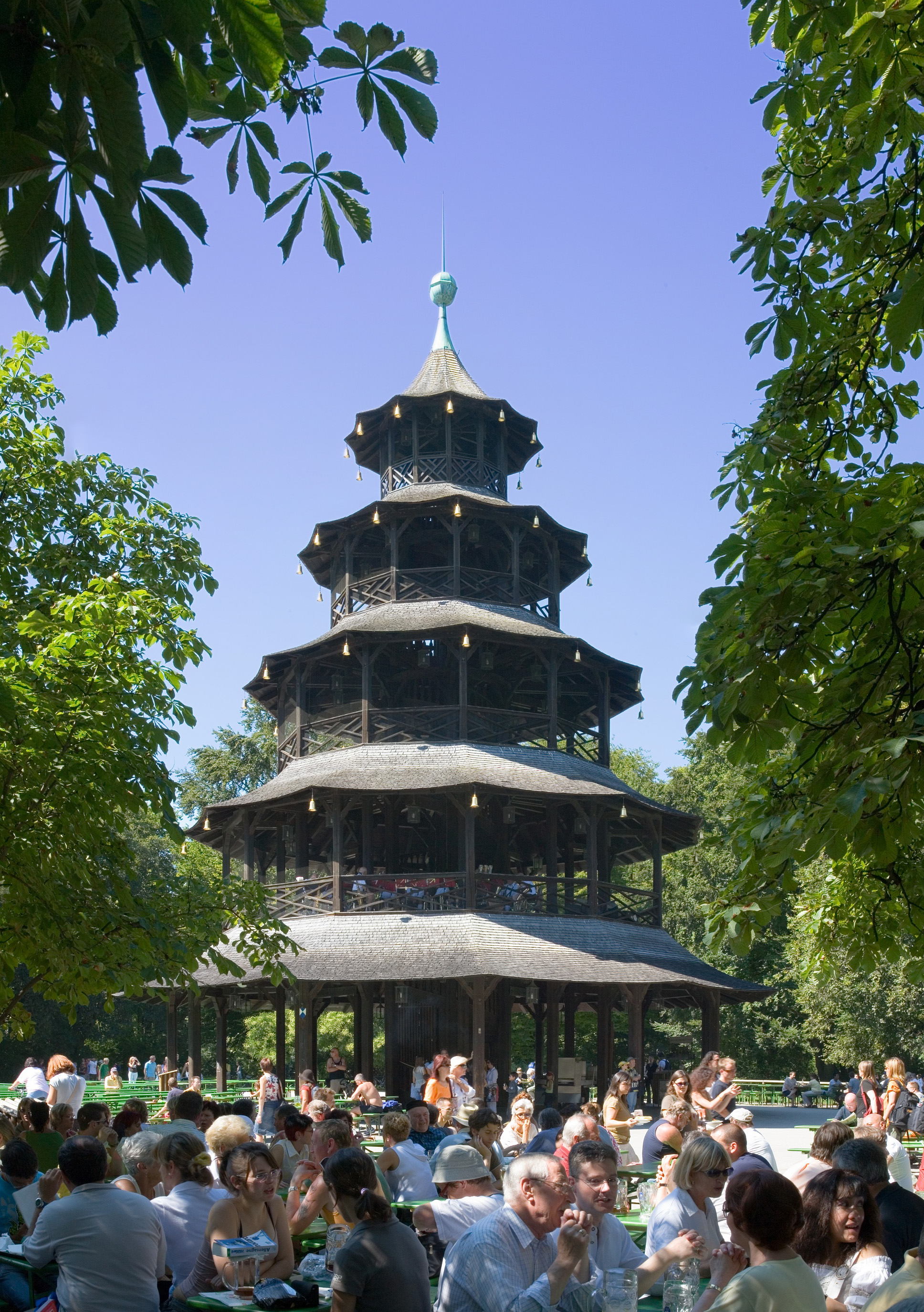
- The Chinese Tower
- Interactive map of Chinese Tower
- 48°9′9″N 11°35′31.6″E
- Type: Pagoda
- Location: Munich, Germany

History
- Built: 1789

Site notes
- Architect: Johann Baptist Lechner
- Architectural style: Chinoiserie

The Chinese Tower (German: Chinesischer Turm) is a 25-metre wooden building resembling a pagoda at the Englischer Garten in Munich, Germany. The building was constructed from 1789 to 1790 and was opened to the public as an observation deck during the opening of the Englischer Garten in 1792. The tower burned down during the bombing of Munich during World War II and was reopened as a reconstruction in 1952. Today the tower is considered a landmark of the Englischer Garten.

In the 1970s the tower was closed to the public because of security reasons and can since be accessed only by the music groups that still play at the tower. A reconstructed carousel originally dating back to the Biedermeier period is located near the tower, as well as numerous restaurants. The so-called Kocherlball festival has been held at the Chinese Tower on the third Sunday of July since 1989.

== Location and connections ==
The Chinese Tower is located at the southern part of the Englischer Garten in the district of Schwabing. The building is located north of the Monopteros and Ökonomiegebäude structures and a few metres east of the Oberstjägermeisterbach river. The Rumfordhaus building is located east of the tower.

The Chinese Tower can be reached by public transport of the Münchner Verkehrsgesellschaft. The bus stop Chinesischer Turm is located immediately next to the tower and can be accessed by public transport and bicycles. The tower can also be accessed by tram at the stop Tivolistraße. The stop has a connection to the bus stop Chinesischer Turm. The closest station of the Munich U-Bahn is Giselastraße, trafficked by two lines of the Stammstrecke 1. The Englischer Garten can be accessed by a ten-minute walk from the station.

== History ==
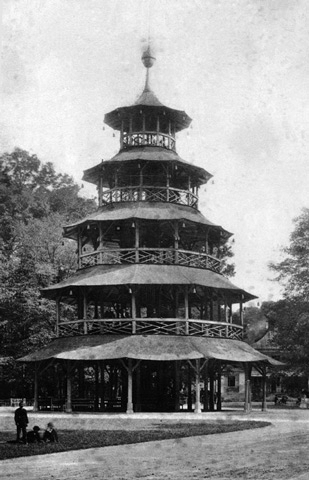
The original structure from 1895

The Chinese Tower was designed from 1789 to 1790 by Johann Baptist Lechner on a proposal by Joseph Frey as part of the planned citizens' park, nowadays known as the Englischer Garten. The construction was done by Johann Baptist Erlacher and Martin Heilmayr, two master carpenters with local roots. Chinese architecture was popular in Europe at the time, so Benjamin Thompson, who was in charge of construction of the not yet opened Englischer Garten, either proposed the construction of the Chinese Tower or undertook it himself. The Chinese Tower was inspired by the 50-metre Great Pagoda at the Royal Botanic Gardens in London, United Kingdom, which was itself inspired by the Majolica Pagoda in Peking, China. Two years after the construction of the "great pagoda" as the tower was known at the time, the first royal festival was held at the Englischer Garten, which was known as "Theodors-Park" at the time. In the same year the entire park including the Chinese Tower were opened to the public; the park had earlier been the private hunting ground of the House of Wittelsbach.

At first the Chinese Tower mostly served as an observation deck. Because of this the trees around the tower did not reach higher than the first two floors of the tower. Nowadays many trees reach over the wooden structure, making it no longer usable as an observation deck. The tower still became popular because of the numerous restaurants located nearby, and became known as the "heart of the Englischer Garten" according to writer Daniela Dau.

Friedrich Ludwig Sckell, who since 1804 administered the royal gardens in Munich, including the Englischer Garten, made a new proposal for the Englischer Garten in 1807, where he wanted to demolish the already existing Chinese Tower. As a stylistic purist, he wanted to avoid architectural staffages and limit the park to few, simple classic buildings. According to him "the Chinese style of architecture is not worth mimicking". However, he was not able to implement this plan.

The Chinese Tower frequently suffered fire damage, which was repaired every time. On 13 June 1944, near the end of World War II, the tower burned down in a white phosphorus attack. The tower was reconstructed in its original style from 1951 to 1952 by the architect Franz Zell and the ceremonial reopening of the tower took place on 6 September 1952. The building has since been known as a "landmark of the Englischer Garten". In 1960 the tower was made accessible to the public again. However, access to the public has been restricted since the 1970s because of safety reasons; only musical groups playing at the tower are allowed access. The tower is only accessible to the public on rare occasions, such at the 50th anniversary of its reopening on 6 September 2002, and only for groups up to 15 people at a time.

In 2002 the Chinese Tower was made into a Wi-Fi hotspot in the Englischer Garten. It successfully served in a pilot project all over Germany.

== Architecture ==
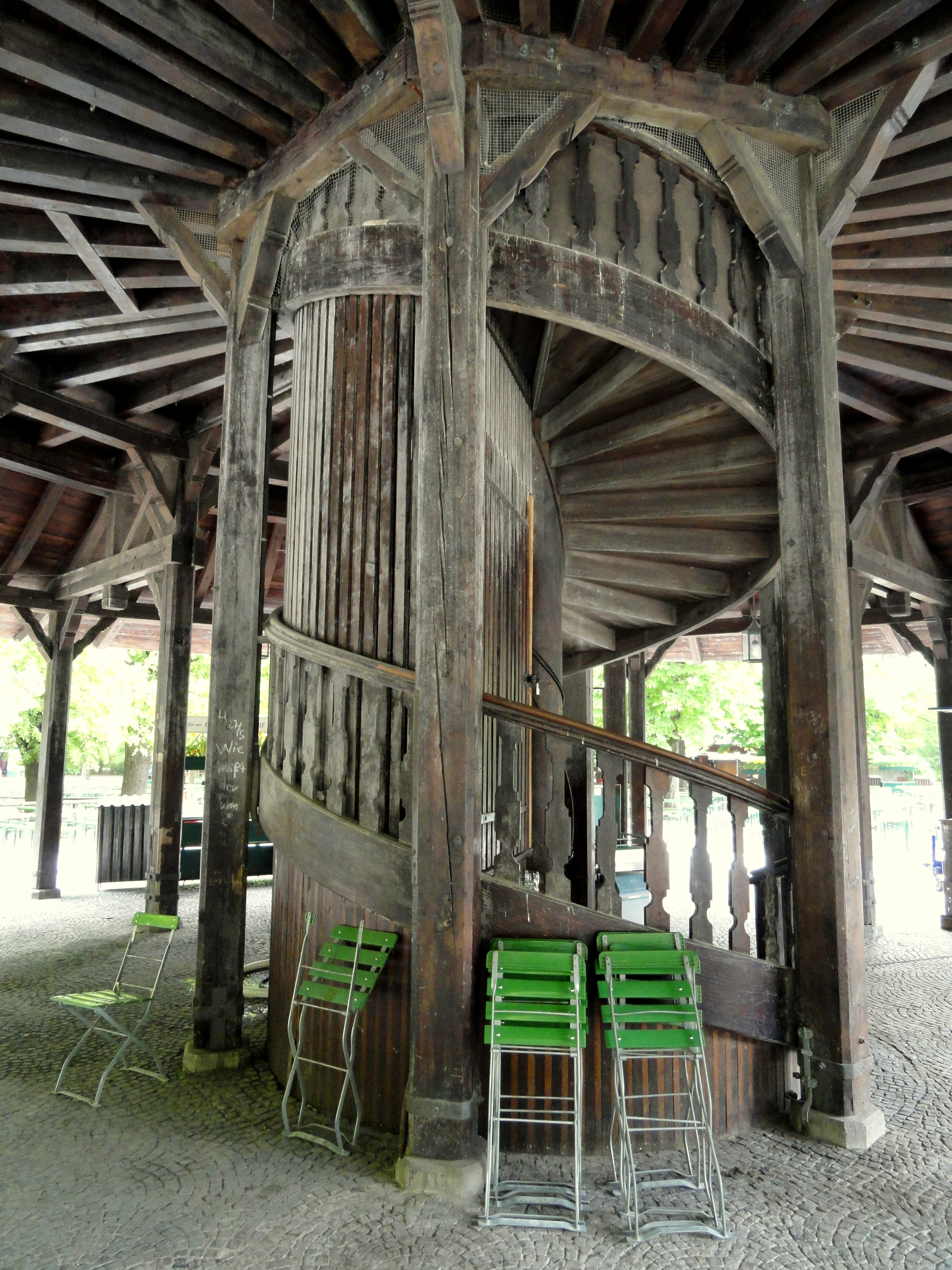
The winding stairway

The wooden Chinese Tower is supposed to resemble a Chinese temple in the style of a pagoda. The building is 25 metres tall and has five floors including the ground floor. Like a pine tree, the tower narrows down upwards floor by floor. Each floor is supported by wood shingles. Gold-coloured bells hang on the corners on the inside of the tower. There is a winding stairway connecting the floors in the middle of the tower. Each floor is supported by wooden beams from underneath. The maximum diameter of the tower is about 19 metres, while the minimum diameter of each floor is 6 metres.

Together with the Rumfordhaus and the Monopteros, the Chinese Tower belongs to the three "feeling architectures" in the Englischer Garten.

== Carousel ==
The first carousel for children was constructed near the Chinese Tower in 1823, but this carousel does not exist any more. In 1913 a new carousel with wooden animal figures (deer, ibex, camel, giraffe, horse, stork and flamingo) with old-fashioned coaches, carriages and sleds was opened. The carousel with its Biedermeier-era figures rotates accompanied by orchestrion and polyphon music. The animal figures are divided into an inner and an outer ring. There is a play park for children near the carousel. The carousel was made by the sculptor Joseph Erlacher and the decorative painter August Julier. Since 1977 the carousel, along with the Chinese Tower and the Englischer Garten, has belonged to the Bavarian Administration of State-Owned Palaces, Gardens and Lakes.

== Events ==
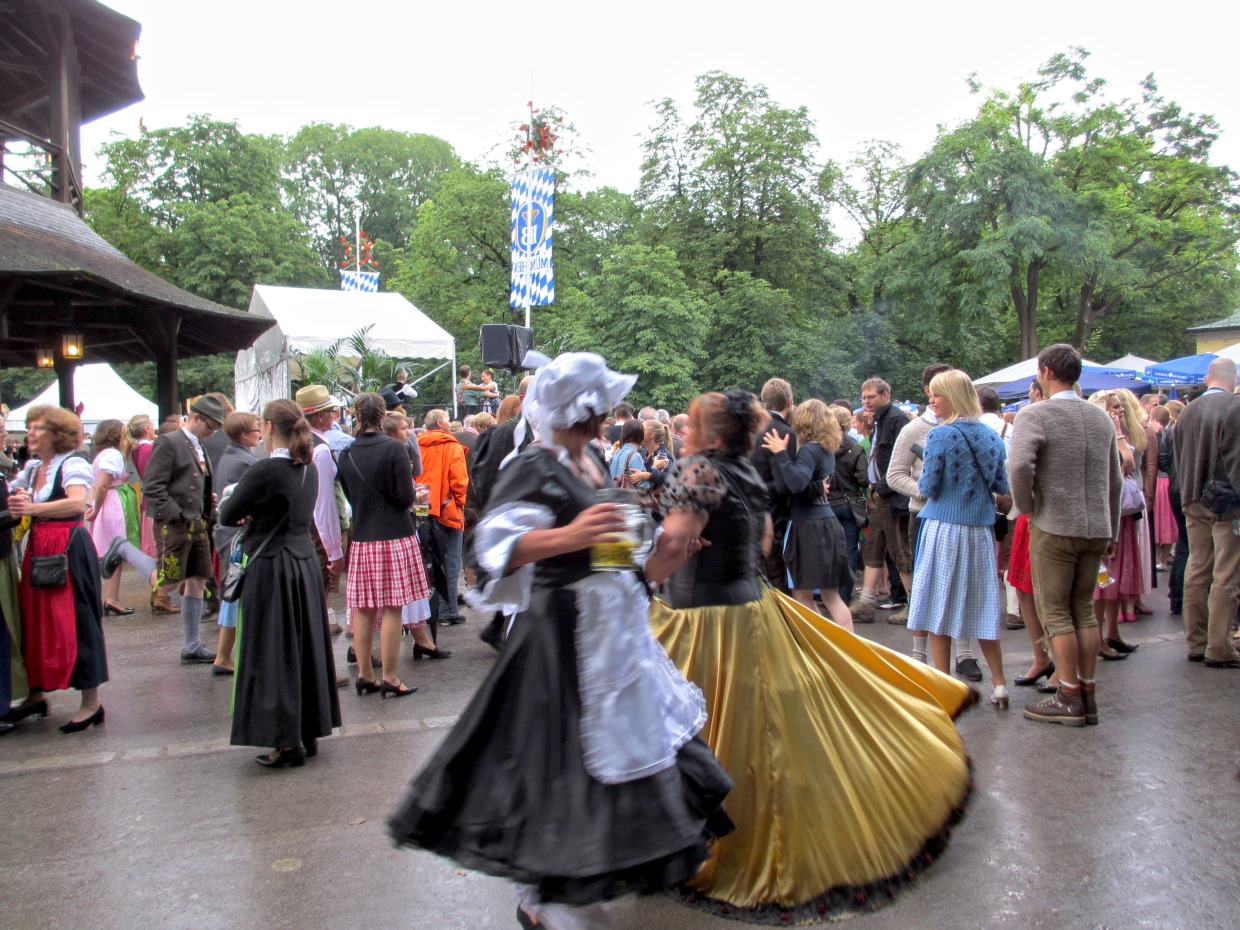
Kocherlball 2012

There are various regular and irregular events at the Chinese Tower.

Many men and women in Tracht meet at 06:00 in the morning on the third Sunday of July for the annual Kocherlball, to dance folk dances and waltzes. This event comes from a habit of cooks, maids and servers to meet at the Chinese Tower on summer Sundays before the start of their workday, to dance together. The ball was established in 1880 and was first attended by around 5000 people. In 1904 the police forbade the Kocherlball as "unethical". This tradition was re-established in 1989 during the 200th anniversary of the Englischer Garten, however the ball is now held on only one Sunday in the year. The first re-established Kocherlball was attended by around 15 thousand people. The number of attendees shrank to around 10 thousand in the following years. In 2002 and 2013 the event was attended by about 12 thousand people and the 16th re-established ball was attended by about 15 thousand people. In 2014 another Kocherlball was held in Bad Tölz to celebrate the 100th anniversary of the Tölzer Kurhaus.

As well as the Kocherlball, 21 more events were held at the Chinese Tower to celebrate the 200th anniversary of the Englischer Garten. At Christmas time a Christmas market is held at the Chinese Tower.

On Sundays and public holidays in summer live music is played at the ground floor of the Chinese Tower alternating between the musical groups Rossbachtaler and Thoma.

== Restaurants ==
In the Biedermeier era from 1825 to 1848 the Chinesische Wirtschaft was located south of the Chinese Tower, with a bowling alley and a dance floor. During this time beer was also served at the Chinese Tower. On three days every week a concert or military band would play dance music. During this time there were four small wooden pavilions with characteristic curly roofs in the area. In 1912 a new inn was erected at the site.

There has been a beer garden run by Antje Schneider since 1974, with 7000 seating places, which is the second largest beer garden in Munich after the Hirschgarten. The beer garden, which sells Hofbräu beer, is one of the most famous places for tourists. Traditional Bavarian Brotzeit can also be consumed at the beer garden.

The Restaurant am Chinesischer Turm is also located near the beer garden. The restaurant serves regional and international cuisine. The Bavarian royal court used to frequent the restaurant in the 19th century.

== In art and literature ==
The Chinese Tower is often mentioned or depicted in art and literature together with the Englischer Garten. In 1830 Moritz Gottlieb Saphir wrote a poem called Der chinesische Turm about the life of people and the nature around the tower. Five years later a letter from Bettina von Arnim to Johann Wolfgang von Goethe was published, in which she writes about the Chinese Tower. In 1840 an anonymous author in the Vaterländischer Magazin wrote a column about dining at the tower.

The Chinese Tower inspired numerous artists already in the 18th century, using it as the primary or secondary subject in paintings and drawings. Artists depicting the Chinese Tower have included Carl August Lebschée, Johann Michael Mettenleiter, Fritz Schider, and Richard Mahn.
