= Galerie Moos =

Art gallery and auction house

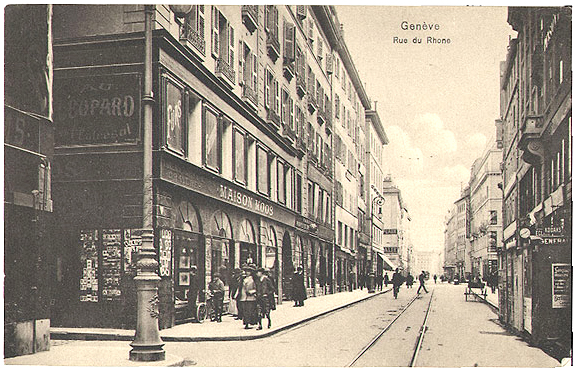
- Interactive map of Galerie Moos
- 46°12′13″N 6°08′49″E
- Alternative name: Maison Moos
- Location: 13, rue du Marché 1204 Geneve, Switzerland
- Established: 1906
- Dissolution: 1976
- Director: Max Moos

The Maison Moos, later called the Galerie Moos, was an art gallery and auction house founded in 1906 in Geneva by the art dealer Max Moos. The gallery closed in 1976.

A distinction must be made between the Galerie Moos founded by Max Moos, the father, and the Galerie Georges Moos founded by his son in 1941, also in Geneva, which was closed in 1986. Several other art galleries have been established around the world by various members of the Moos family: in Karlsruhe, New York, Toronto, and Zurich.

== History ==
Between 1906 and 1976, the Maison Moos and later the Galerie Moos changed address several times.

=== 1906 : Rue du Rhône 29 (Geneva) ===
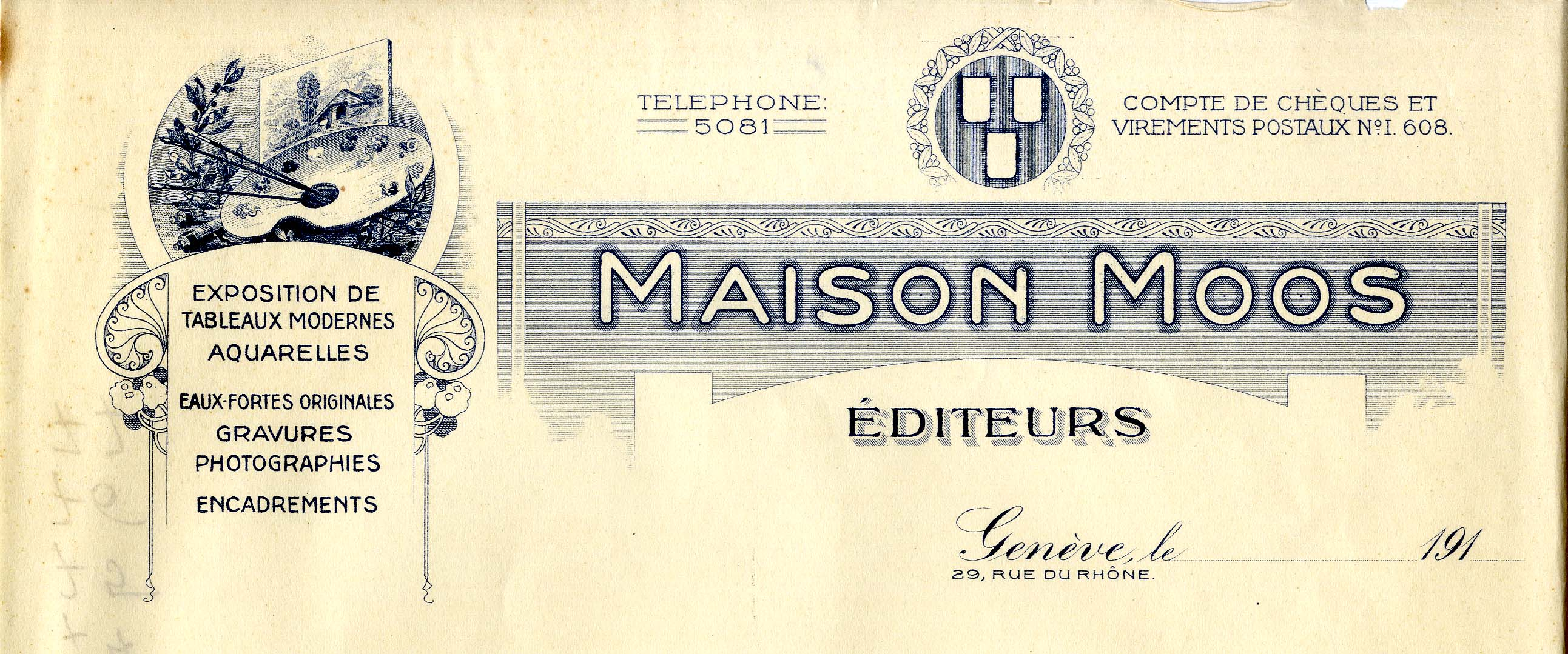
Papier à entête de la Galerie Moos à Genève vers 1910. Ville de Genève. Musées d'art et d'histoire. BAA - Archives de la Galerie Moos, 1999

Max Moos, founder of the Moos company (Geneva), was born in 1880 in Randegg in Baden Württemberg, Germany. Son of Heinrich Moos and Rosalie Bloch, he spent his childhood in Karlsruhe where his father ran a xylography and electroplating workshop for the postcard industry. He traveled to France and Spain, and then settled in Geneva in 1906. With his sister Hedwig Moos, he opened a store selling picture frames and illustrated postcards at 29 rue du Rhône, the same address as the Swiss painter Ferdinand Hodler.

From 1910 Moos focuses more on art dealing

=== 1913 : Grand-Quai 10 (Geneva) ===
In 1913 Max Moos opened an art gallery in new premises at the Place du Port, at Grand-Quai 10 (now Quai-Général-Guisan). He also obtained his Geneva citizenship. His letterhead becomes Gallery: Moos Geneva.

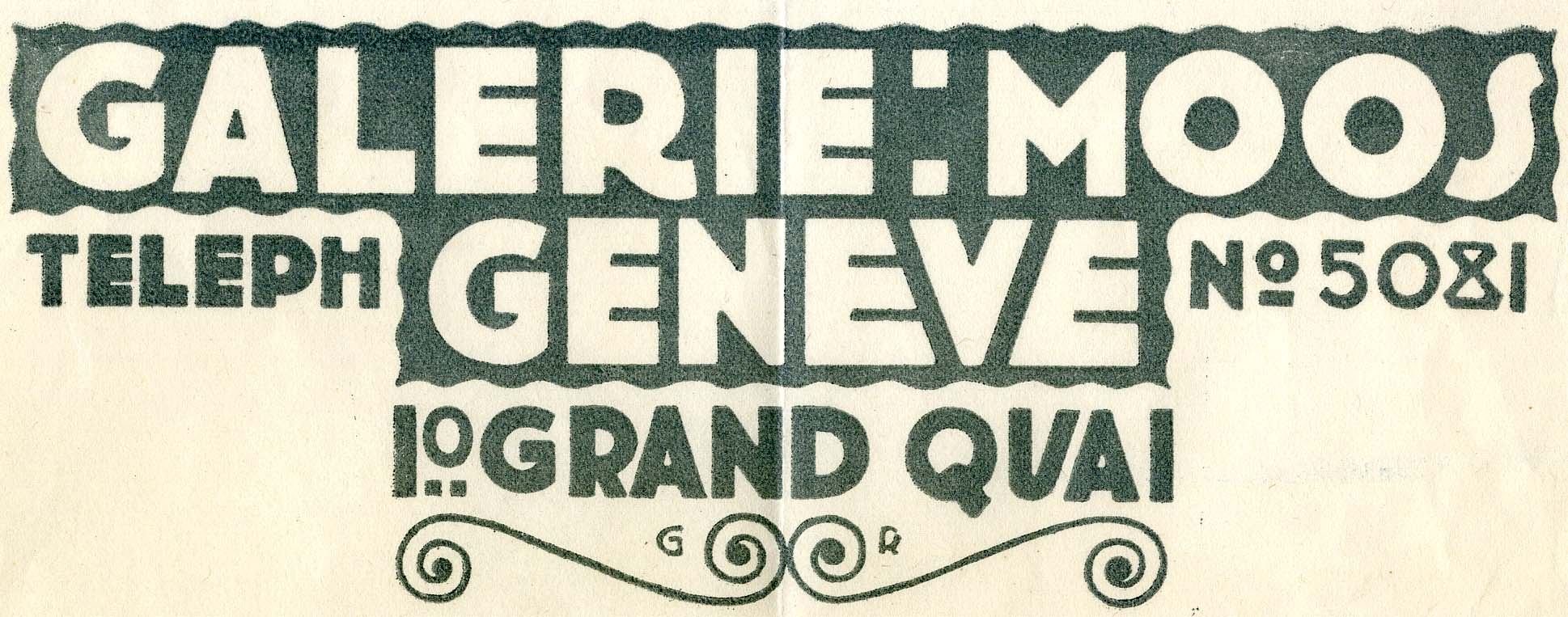
Papier à entête de la Galerie Moos à Genève vers 1913. Ville de Genève. Musées d'art et d'histoire. BAA - Archives de la Galerie Moos, 1999

Exhibitions organised included (L'Espagne (ses peintres), Paris (ses peintres), Max Buri, Ferdinand Hodler, Otto Vautier,) (Cuno Amiet, Maurice Barraud, Giovanni Giacometti, Emile Bressler, Gustave Buchet, etc.) Moos published catalogs and worked closely with a journalist art critic to promote the business.

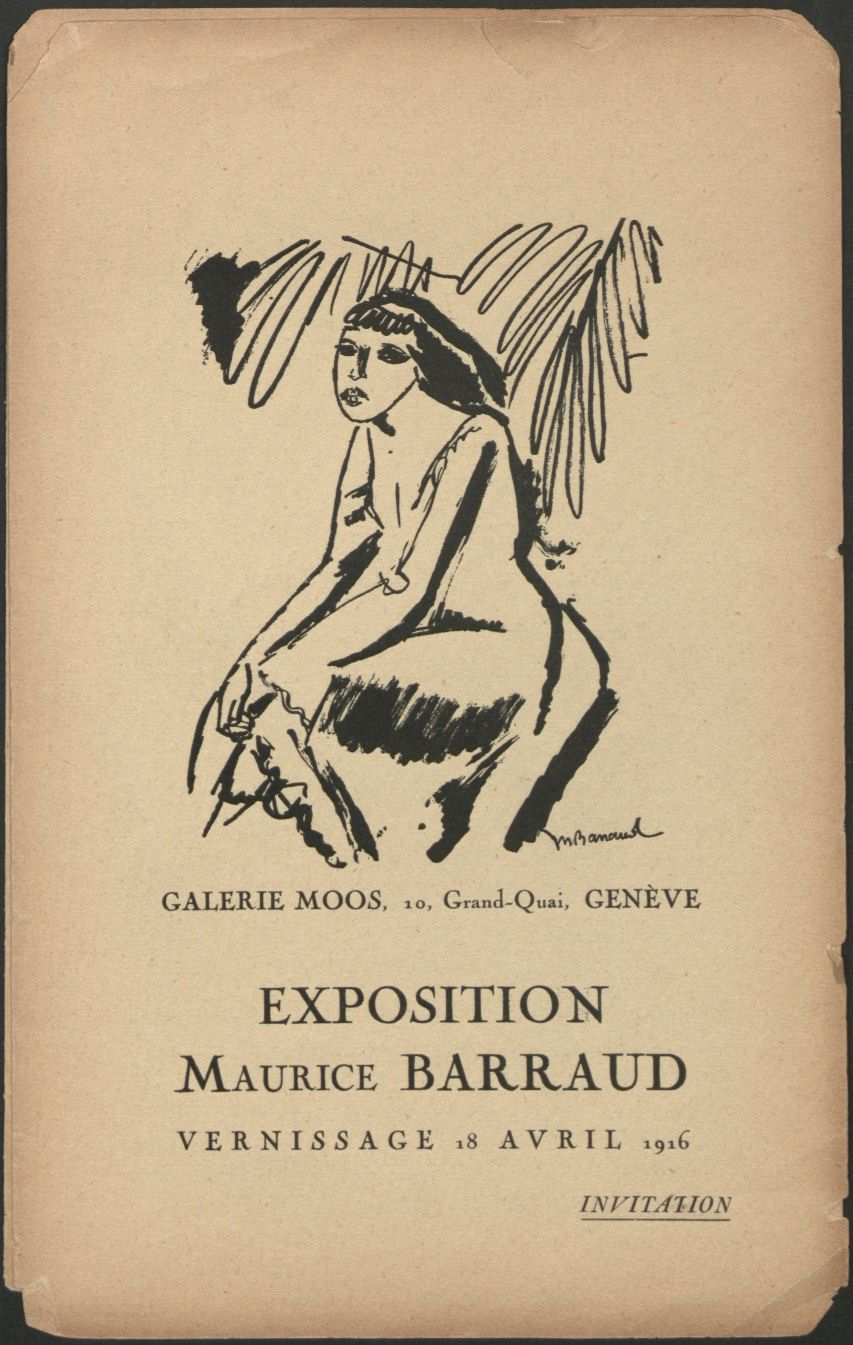
Catalogue d'exposition Maurice Barraud, Galerie Moos, 10, Grand-Quai, Genève, 18 avril 1916. Numérisation Bibliothèque d'art et d'archéologie (BAA), Genève

The start of the First World War in 1914, caused artists to return to Switzerland from France. Le groupe du Falot was founded by the painter Maurice Barraud. The closure of the Musée Rath, which was used by the International Prisoners of War Agency of the International Committee of the Red Cross, made Moos Gallery the leading place for contemporary art exhibitions in Geneva until 1921. The arrival of French refugees brought a new potential clientele to the gallery. In order to satisfy these new buyers, Max Moos diversified his offer by proposing, on a permanent basis, impressionist and post-impressionist works (Pierre Bonnard, Paul Cézanne, Vincent Van Gogh, Claude Monet, Camille Pissarro, etc.) which he brought to Geneva thanks to his relations with several Parisian dealers. In 1916, in collaboration with Paul Vallotton, agent of the Paris gallery Bernheim-Jeune set up in Lausanne, presenting the Exposition de peinture française moderne. From 1915, the Moos Gallery had a virtual monopoly on the artistic production of the painter Ferdinand Hodler.

=== 1917 : Rue du Marché 13 (Genève) ===
En May 1918, Moos organised L'Exposition Ferdinand Hodler accompanied by a catalog printed in 3 000 copies, and authored by famous journalists Johannès Widmer, Carl-Albert Loosli et Lucienne Florentin. Moos assembled 281 works from his own collections and those of his most loyal clients and associates. He also solicited loans from private individuals, in particular Louis Gunzbürger, a great collector of Hodler's work, who provided him with practically his entire collection, i.e. 39 works, including 23 paintings. After Hodler's death, the exhibition became a retrospective and a huge success.

Starting in 1920, Moos gets into the auction business.

Malgré une programmation de concerts et d'expositions de qualité (Carlos Schwabe, Degas, Les Cubistes, etc.), la Galerie Moos dépense plus qu'elle ne vend et sera rattrapée par la crise économique de l'après-guerre. Le marché de l'art n'est plus favorable à Genève et le 2 décembre 1921, Max Moos et ses associés sont obligés de vendre l'immeuble de la rue du Marché à la société La Pharmacie Principale (Jean de Tolédo) et de liquider la galerie entre mars et avril 1922.

=== 1922 : Rue de la Boétie 14 (Paris) ===
In March 1922, Max Moos moved to Paris to open a new gallery at 14 rue de la Boëtie, where the art market seemed to be flourishing. On this occasion, he presented an exhibition devoted to the painter Eugène Carrière and then inaugurated, some time later, an exhibition devoted to Laure Bruni. Little is known about this period of the gallery, except that Max Moos was seriously ill and that his Parisian partner took advantage of this to defraud him. The Parisian episode of the Moos Gallery did not last more than a year.

=== 1927 : Quai du Mont-Blanc 31 et rue du Léman 3 (Genève) ===
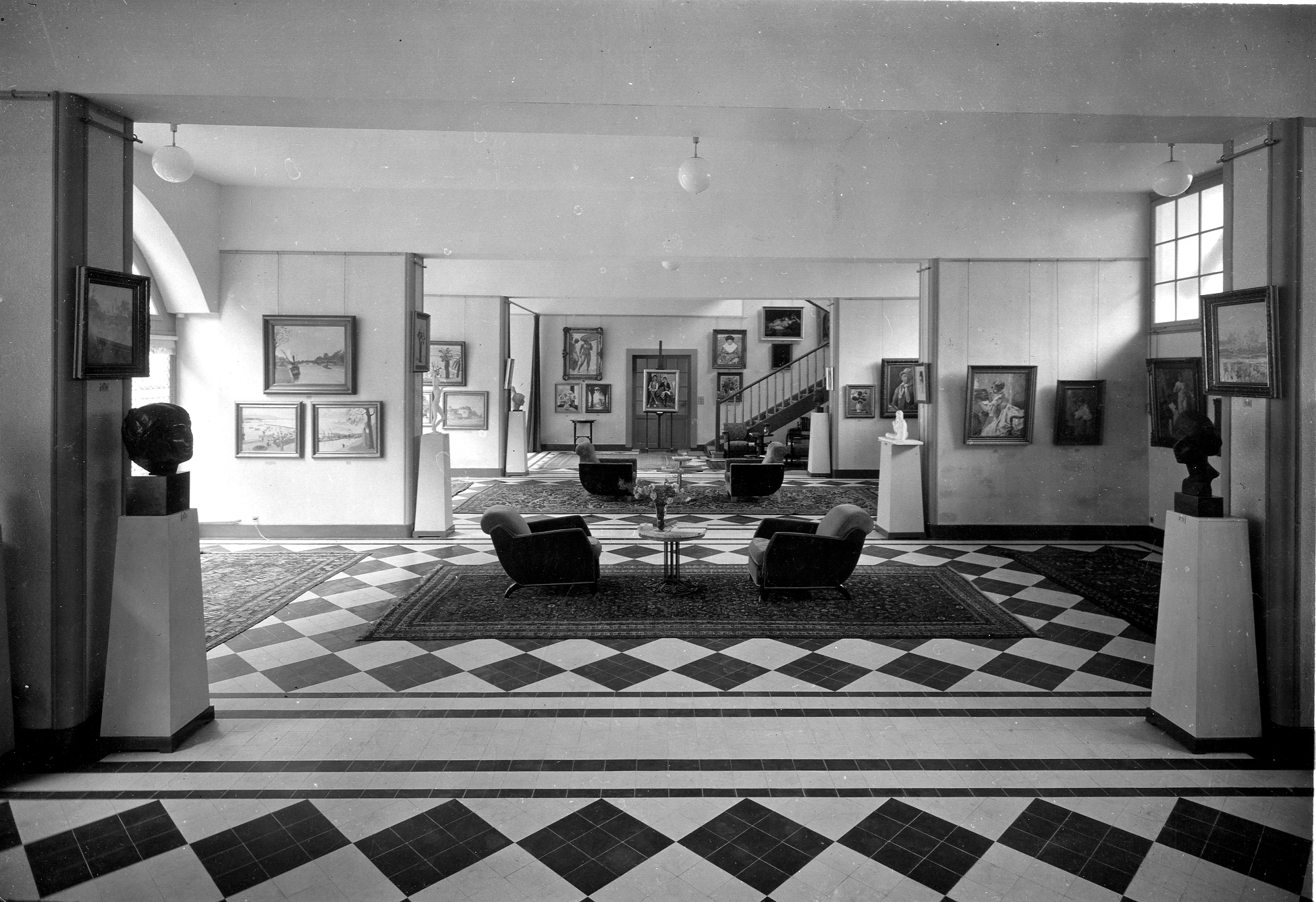
Intérieur de la Galerie Moos, rue du Léman, 3. Photogr, L, L, Pricam. Ville de Genève. Musées d'art et d'histoire. BAA - Archives de la Galerie Moos, 1999.

In 1927 Max Moos opened a new gallery at 3 rue du Léman. He kept, however, the old address for the trade of "Antique Art", "Objets d'art" and "antique furniture". But it is in his new premises that he will propose numerous exhibitions of "Modern Art", contemporary Swiss and international art: the "School of Paris", Norwegian painting (prefaced by the painter E. Munch), Polish... He will also present an exhibition entitled 21 artists of the Italian Novecento sponsored by an impressive Honorary Committee chaired by Benito Mussolini.

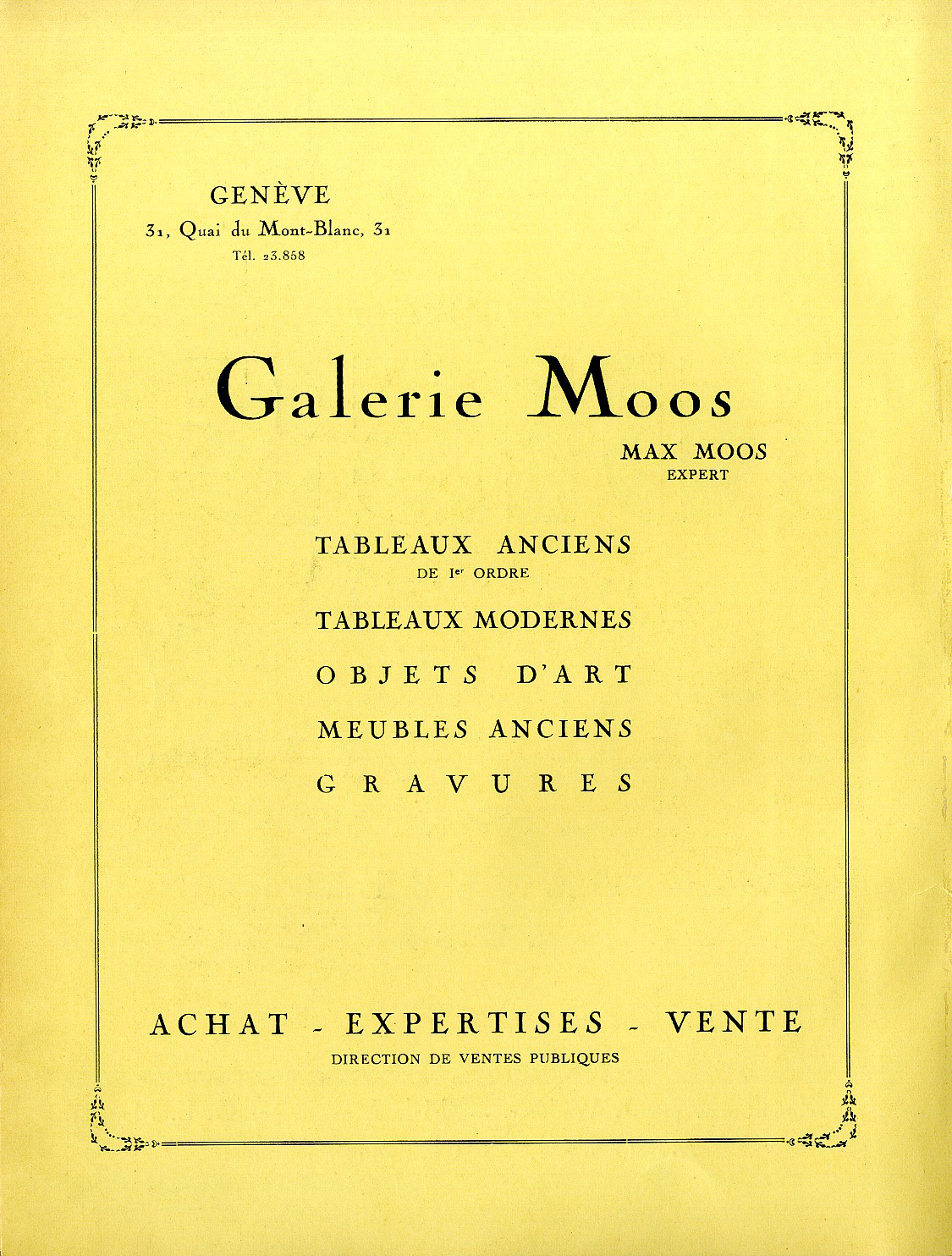
Publicité pour la Galerie Moos publiée dans la revue "L'Art en Suisse", janvier 1931, No. 1. Numérisation Bibliothèque d'art et d'archéologie (BAA), Genève.

In 1930, Max Moos embarked on a very ambitious commercial project that had the Swiss painter François Barraud as its workhorse. In order to promote the project, the journalist Lucienne Florentin was asked to write articles and a monograph on the artist and to organize a large François Barraud exhibition. A second exhibition took place in 1932 at the Galerie du Portique in Paris in collaboration with the Galerie Moos. The exhibition was a great success and Moos sold his paintings to his loyal customers as well as to new generations of collectors. The art critic Pierre Courthion see in François Barraud « le successeur de Hodler et Vallotton ».

Between 1927 and 1939, he specialized in organizing auctions. The most prestigious ones brought together up to 400 paintings, pieces of furniture and art objects. More than thirty auctions of Geneva, Swiss and international collections were held, including those belonging to Ernest Ponti, Paul Chavan and Johannes Widmer.

On May 19, 1938, twenty years after Ferdinand Hodler's death, Moos devoted a new retrospective exhibition to him titled 'Exposition Commémorative 1918-1928'.

In 1939, a few days before the outbreak of the Second World War, Max Moos and his wife Fanny Moos went to New York for their daughter's wedding, but because of the world conflict, they did not return to Geneva until 1946. Several members of the Moos family, who remained in Europe, were victims of persecution and deportation by the Third Reich.

Until 1946, during the forced exile of his parents in New York, his son Georges Moos will take over the management of the Galerie Moos (Père). A few exhibitions were still held at Rue du Léman 3: the painter Paul Albert Mathey in 1940, Lucien Schwob in 1941 and the auction of furniture from the collection of Mr. and Mrs. Moos to finance his parents' stay in the United States

Pendant son exil à New York, Moos continuera la promotion de sa collection, en organisant des expositions F. Barraud à la Knoedler Gallery, F. Hodler à la Durand-Ruel Galleries et au San Francisco De Young Museum (7-8 September 1940).

=== 1946 : Quai du Mont-Blanc 31 (Geneva) ===
On his return to Geneva in 1946, Moos terminated the lease of the Galerie du Léman 3. From 1950 on, he organized several more auctions, always faithful to Ferdinand Hodler; a last retrospective exhibition was held in 1958 for the 40th anniversary of the painter's death. Then the gallery owner gradually slowed down his activities. An invitation card still mentions a Pierre Jacques exhibition le 15 avril 1967, au quai du Mont Blanc 31. Les dernières expositions ont lieu à son domicile, les cartons d'invitation portent la mention : Chez Max Moos.

Max Moos died at age 97 on October 11, 1976 in Geneva and Galerie Moos closed for good in 1976.

=== Controversial sales ===
A John Constable painting acquired by George Moos during World War II was later the object of a restitution claim by the Jaffé heirs, and several artworks listed on the German Lost Art Foundation website passed through Moos during the Nazi era.

== Selected exhibits ==
1913 : Exposition l'Espagne (ses peintres) : œuvres de Castelucho, Fornerod, Gumery, Marin Ramos, Morerod, Ribera, Sala, Vasquez-Diaz : Galerie de tableaux modernes, Maison Moos, Grand-Quai 10, Genève 29, Rue du Rhône, du 1er au 31 août 1913

1913 : Exposition Max Buri, Ferdinand Hodler, Otto Vautier : Galerie Moos, Grand-Quai, 10, Genève, du 1er au 30 novembre 1913

1914 : Exposition Maurice Barraud, E. Bressler, G. François : [Galerie Moos, 10 Rue Grand Quai, Genève], du 15 janvier au 15 février [1914]

1914 : Exposition Cuno Amiet, James Vibert : du 2 mars au 31 mars..., [Galerie Moos, 10, Grand Quai, Genève] : [catalogue] / [L. Florentin]

1916 : Exposition Maurice Barraud : Galerie Moos, 10 Rue Grand Quai, Genève, vernissage 18 avril 1916

1916 : Exposition de peinture française : catalogue, Galerie Moos, 10 Grand Quai, Genève, du 15 juin au 31 juillet 1916

1918 : Exposition suisse des beaux-arts : Galerie Moos, Genève, Rue du Marché, 13, du 22 janvier au 28 février 1918

1918 : Giovanni Giacometti, Otto Vautier, Maurice Sarkissoff : expositions, Galerie Moos, 13, Rue du Marché, 13, Genève, du 9 avril au 8 mai 1918

1918 : Exposition Ferdinand Hodler : 11 mai - 30 juin 1918, Galerie Moos, [13 Rue du Marché], Genève

1919 : Expositions Degas, A. Apol, Edmond Bille, E. Geiger, Ph. Robert, Aug. Sartori, Otto Vautier : Galerie Moos, 13, Rue du Marché, 13, Genève, du 10 avril au 8 mai 1919

1920 : Carlos Schwab, A. Fournier, O. Vautier, F. Smeers, E. Barbaroux, Massot, J. de Boerzoenyi, G. de Latenay : Galerie Moos, 13, Rue du Marché, 13, Genève, mars 1920

1920 : Les cubistes : la jeune peinture française : Galerie Moos, 13 Rue du Marché, Genève, février 1920

1922 : Laure Bruni : exposition, Galerie Moos, 14, Rue la Boëtie, Paris, 27 mars - 15 avril 1922

1923 : Exposition Frédéric Dufaux : exposition, Galerie Moos, 31, Quai du Mont-Blanc, 31, Genève, du 8 au 31 décembre 1923

1929 : Deuxième exposition d'artistes du novecento italien : Galerie Moos, [3, Rue du Léman], Genève, juin-juillet 1929

1931 : Exposition François Barraud : Galerie Moos, 3, Rue du Léman, 3, Genève, juin 1931

1932 : François Barraud : au Portique, Paris, du 28 mai au 25 juin 1932

1933 : François Barraud : Galerie Moos, 3, Rue du Léman, 3, Genève, [exposition du] 20 mai-20 juin 1933

1938 : Ferdinand Hodler : exposition commémorative à l'occasion du XXme anniversaire de sa mort : Genève, Galerie Moos, [Rue du Léman 3], Genève : du 19 mai au 19 juin 1938

1940 : Paintings by Ferdinand Hodler 1853 - 1918, New York, Durand-Ruel Galleries, 1 - 31.5.1940

1940 : Exhibition of paintings by Francois Barraud, 1899–1934, New York : Knoedler & Co.'s Galleries, 14–26 October 1940

1956 : Exposition "Retour à la nature" par Pierre Jaques : chez Max Moos, Genève, octobre-novembre 1956

1961 : Exposition d'art français : chez Max Moos, Quai du Mont-Blanc, 31, Genève, 8 avril-31 mai 1961

1965 : Exposition d'art français : chez Max Moos, Quai du Mont-Blanc 31, Genève, mars-avril 1965

== Auctions ==
1920 : Catalogue of ancient and modern paintings : objects of art and furniture... from the collection of the late Dr. L. and which will be sold in Geneva, Galerie Moos, 13, rue du Marché, on Monday 26 April and Tuesday 27 April 1920

1931 : Views and costumes of Geneva, the canton of Vaud and Savoy : old engravings in different genres : paintings, watercolors and original drawings coming from the collection of the late Mr. Henri Fatio and from the estate of an amateur from Lausanne : auction in Geneva, Galerie Moos, [3, rue du Léman], on June 23 and 24, 1931... by the ministry of Me Ch. D. Cosandier...

1932 : Collections of Mrs Mary C. Blair, Chambésy and of the countess A. d'Oustinoff, Nice : paintings, watercolors, drawings and engravings, objects of art and furnishings, furniture... : the sale of which will take place in Geneva, Galerie Moos, 3, rue du Léman, on 2 and 3 December 1932... by the ministry of Me Ch. D. Cosandier

1933: Collection of a Geneva amateur: auction sale, Geneva, Galerie Moos, 3 Rue du Léman, June 22, 1933...

1934: Paintings, watercolors and drawings by Baron, Barraud, Berchère...from the N. A. Groen, Brussels, R. Lazzarelli, Geneva and other provenance and whose sale will take place in Geneva, Galerie Moos, 3, rue du Léman, on March 24, 1934, by the ministry of Me Ch. D. Cosandier assisted by Mr. Max Moos.

1934 : Paintings, watercolors, drawings, objects of art and furnishings, antique and modern furniture... : collections of Mr Charles Amann, antique dealer, private collection of Mrs Mary C. Blair whose sale will take place in Geneva, Galerie Moos, 3, rue du Léman, on 21 and 22 September 1934... by the ministry of Me Ch. D. Cosandier : experts M. Max Moos, M. Aimé Martinet

1935 : Modern paintings, drawings, watercolors and gouaches by François Barraud, Maurice Barraud, H. Berger, Em. Bernard... and 42 important paintings by Ferdinand Hodler from the collection of Mr. Max Moos, to be sold in Geneva, Galerie Moos..., on March 23, 1935... by the ministry of Mr. Ch. Cosandier under the direction of Mr. W.-S. Kundig

1935 : Paintings of the German, Flemish, French, Dutch and Italian schools from the 15th to the 19th century, works by Avercamp, Backhuyzen, Berghem... coming from the private collection of Dr L. D. Van Hengel... and whose sale will take place in Geneva, Galerie Moos, 3, rue du Léman, on May 25, 1935 : by the ministry of Me Ch. D. Cosandier assisted by Mr Max Moos.

1935: Paintings, watercolors, drawings, engravings and miniatures, objects of art and furniture... coming from the domain of Beaulieu, Geneva belonging to Miss Louise Chauvet and to Mr. Maurice Chauvet and of other origin of which the sale will take place in Geneva, Gallery Moos, 3, rue du Léman, on September 27 and 28, 1935 : by the ministry of Mr. Ch. D. Cosandier.

- 1937 : Tableaux anciens des écoles anglaise, française... suisse du XVIe au XIXe siècle : tableaux modernes, dessins et aquarelles œuvres de François Barraud... et 40 tableaux importants de Ferdinand Hodler provenant des collections de Feu M. Paul Chavan, Genève...et dont la vente aura lieu à Genève, Galerie Moos, 3, rue du Léman, le 20 mars 1937 : par le ministère de Me Ch. D. Cosandier assisté par M. Max Moos.
- 1937 : Tableaux anciens des écoles allemande, flamande, française... suisse du XVe au XIXe siècle... : tableaux modernes œuvres de Amiet, François Barraud... et 20 tableaux importants de Ferdinand Hodler provenant des collections de Feu M. le Dr Johannes Widmer, Genève et de M. le Prof. A. Strauss, Vienne...et dont la vente aura lieu à Genève, Galerie Moos, 3, rue du Léman, le 30 octobre 1937 : par le ministère de Me Ch. D. Cosandier assisté par M. Max Moos.
- 1938 : Tableaux anciens des écoles allemande, anglaise, flamande... suisse du XVe au XIXe siècle, œuvres de Brekelenkamp, Clouet, Cuyp... : tableaux modernes œuvres de François Barraud, Boudin... et 19 tableaux importants de Ferdinand Hodler provenant des collections de feu M. Ernest Ponti, Genève et dont la vente aura lieu à Genève, Galerie Moos, 3, rue du Léman, le 2 avril 1938 : par le ministère de Me Ch. D. Cosandier assisté par M. Max Moos
- 1938 : Tableaux, aquarelles, pastels et dessins par Barraud, Berthoud, Bocion, Bressler... : belle collection exclusivement de la collection de feu M. Ernest Ponti, Genève et dont la vente aura lieu à Genève, Galerie Moos, 3, rue du Léman, le 15, 16 et 17 septembre 1938 : par le ministère de Me Ch. D. Cosandier assisté par M. Max Moos
- 1940 : Tableaux, aquarelles, dessins, objets d'art et d'ameublement, meubles anciens et de style, porcelaines, argenterie, étains, tapis, etc. provenant de la collection de M. et Mme Max Moos, Genève, dont la vente aura lieu à Genève, Galerie Moos, 3, rue du Léman, le vendredi après-midi 6 décembre 1940... et le samedi après-midi 7 décembre 1940... par le ministère de M. Ch. Cosandier
- 1941 : Tableaux anciens des écoles allemande, flamande, française... suisse du XVe au XIXe siècle œuvres de Brekelenkamp, Brueghel... : tableaux modernes, aquarelles, dessins par Agasse, Amiet, Anker...provenant des collections de divers amateurs suisses et étrangers dont la vente aura lieu à Genève, Galerie Moos, 3, rue du Léman, le 23 et 24 mai 1941 : par le ministère de Me Ch. D. Cosandier assisté par M. Georges Moos
- 1943 : Tableaux anciens et modernes par Boilly, Brun de Versoix, Hughtenburgh, Santerre... vente aux enchères à la Galerie Georges Moos, Genève, 12, rue Diday, le 30 octobre 1943 : par le ministère de Me Ch. D. Cosandier assisté par M. Georges Moos.

== Bibliography and sources ==
- "Moos, Max" in German, French and Italian in the online Historical Dictionary of Switzerland.
- "Barth, Wilhelm" in German, French and Italian in the online Historical Dictionary of Switzerland.
- "Florentin, Lucienne" in German, French and Italian in the online Historical Dictionary of Switzerland.
- "Courthion, Pierre" in German, French and Italian in the online Historical Dictionary of Switzerland.
- "Olivet, Alfred" in German, French and Italian in the online Historical Dictionary of Switzerland.
- "Vallotton, Paul" in German, French and Italian in the online Historical Dictionary of Switzerland.
- "Sociétés d'artistes" in German, French and Italian in the online Historical Dictionary of Switzerland.
- "Barraud, Maurice" in German, French and Italian in the online Historical Dictionary of Switzerland.
- "Schwob, Lucien" in German, French and Italian in the online Historical Dictionary of Switzerland.
- Le marché de l'art en Suisse du XIXe siècle à nos jours / éd. par Paul-André Jaccard et Sébastien Guex, Lausanne : Unil; Zurich : SIK ISEA, 2011 ISBN 9783908196792
- Le take-off du marché de l'art en Suisse romande durant la première guerre mondiale / P.-A. Jaccard, In Traverse, 2002, n.1, 81-106
- Lucienne Florentin ou les ambivalences d'une critique d'art en Suisse romande / S. Pallini, In Histoire de l'art : bulletin de l'Institut national d'histoire de l'art , 44, Paris : INHA, 1999, p. 11-19
- Critiques d'art de Suisse romande : de Töpffer à Budry / publ. sous la dir. de Philippe Junod et Philippe Kaenel, Lausanne : Payot, 1993 ISBN 260103128X
- Gedenkbuch für die Karlsruher Juden (Généalogie et biographie de la Famille Moos)
- Ferdinand Hodler dans les collections du musée d'Art et d'Histoire de Genève / Paul Lang, In: Ferdinand Hodler : le paysage : [Musée Rath, Genève, 4 septembre 2003 - 1er février 2004] : [Kunsthaus Zürich, 5 mars - 6 juin 2004], p. 185-195 ISBN 2850566578
- Paul-André Jaccard, «Le Falot» Künstlergruppen in der Schweiz 1910–1936, cat. d’exp., Aargauer Kunsthaus, Aarau 1981, 47–59.
- La Galerie Paul Vallotton : depuis 1913... / Marina Ducrey, Guy Ducrey, Lausanne : Ed. Galerie Vallotton, [1988]
- Genève, In : Journal de Genève. - Genève. - 28 septembre 1918, rubrique "Nouvelles des cantons", p. [2]
- Beaux-arts : critiques, marchands de tableaux / Louis Baudit, Genève : L. Baudit, 1919
- "Florentin" dit "L'oracle des arts" / Albert Trachsel, Genève : [A. Trachsel], 1920 (Genève : Dubouchet & Giamboni)
- Un scandale ! : Lettre ouverte à Monsieur Stoessel, conseiller administratif, délégué aux beaux-arts / Louis Baudit, Genève : [s.n.], 1921
- Le plus grand collectionneur d'Hodler : les obsèques et la vie de M. David Schmidt / Louis Baudit, In: ABC. - Genève. - 22 mai 1912, p. 2
- L'exposition Hodler-Buri-Vautier à la Galerie Moos / C., In: ABC. - Genève. - 11-12 octobre 1913, p. 1
- Exposition Ferdinand Hodler, In: La Tribune de Genève. - Genève. - 24 mai 1916, rubrique "Notes d'art", p. 3
- Aux nouvelles galeries Moos / JOHP, In: La Tribune de Genève. - Genève. - 7 février 1918, rubrique "Notes d'art", p. 4
- L'Exposition suisse des Beaux-Arts à la galerie Moos / J. Cd., In: Journal de Genève et Gazette de Lausanne. - Genève. - 8 février 1918, rubrique "Feuilleton du Journal de Genève", p. 2
- On annonce de Genève la mort, à l'âge de soixante-cinq ans, du peintre Ferdinand Hodler..., In : Journal des débats. - Paris. - 22 mai 1918, rubrique "Nécrologie", p. 4
- Salon Moos / Cd., In Journal de Genève. - Genève. - 14 décembre 1923, rubrique "Beaux-Arts", p. 6
- 21 artistes du Novecento italien exposent à Genève / Lucienne Florentin, In: La Suisse. - Genève. - 18 juin 1929
- François Barraud / Lucienne Florentin, In La suisse. - Genève. - 2 juin 1931
- Max Moos, In Journal de Genève. - Genève. - 14 octobre 1976, p. 13
