= Max Buri =

Swiss painter (1868–1915)

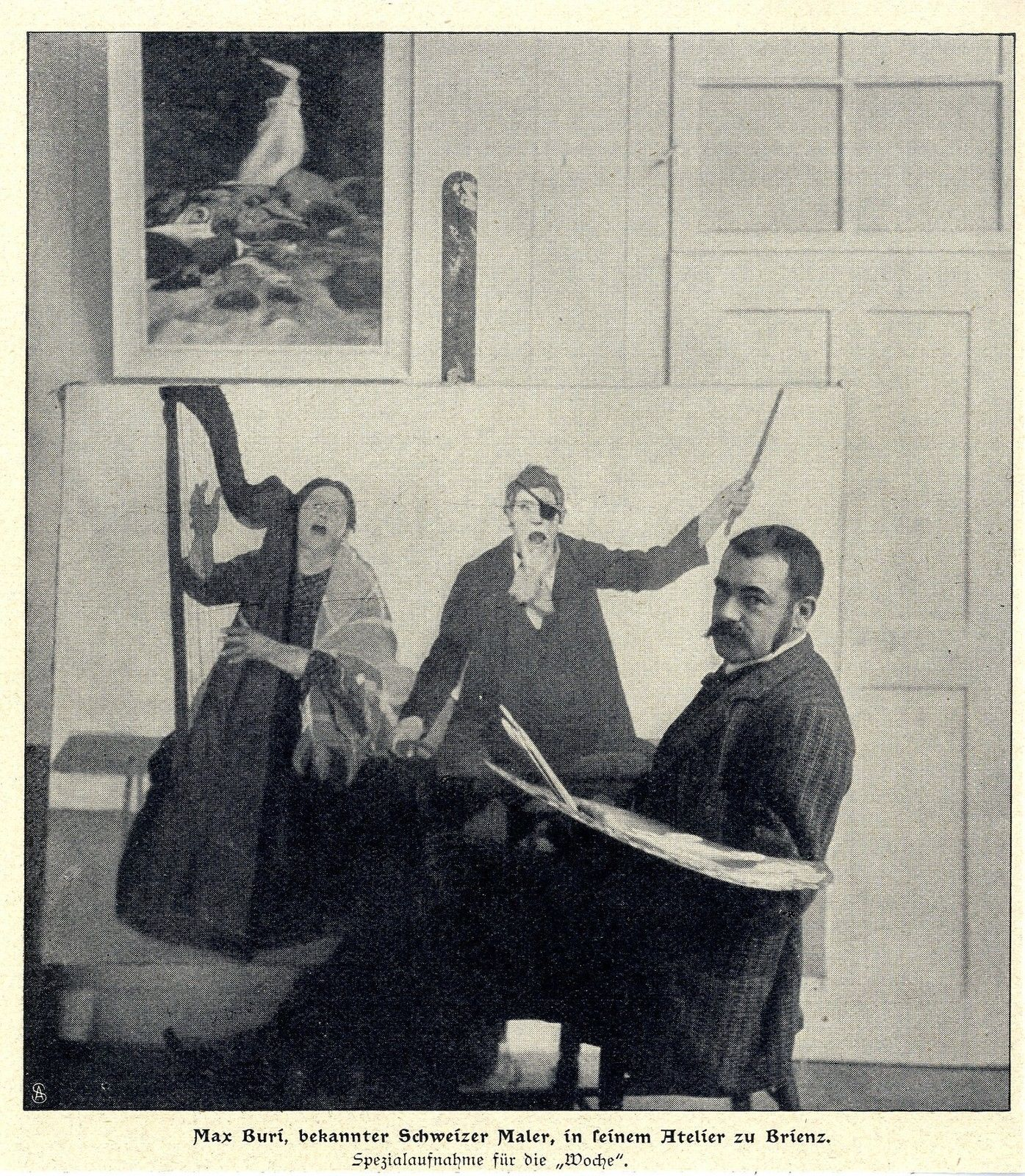
Max Buri in his studio (1907), from Die Woche

Max Alfred Buri (24 July 1868, in Burgdorf – 21 May 1915, in Interlaken) was a Swiss painter. He specialized in portraits of the local peasantry and genre scenes.

== Biography ==
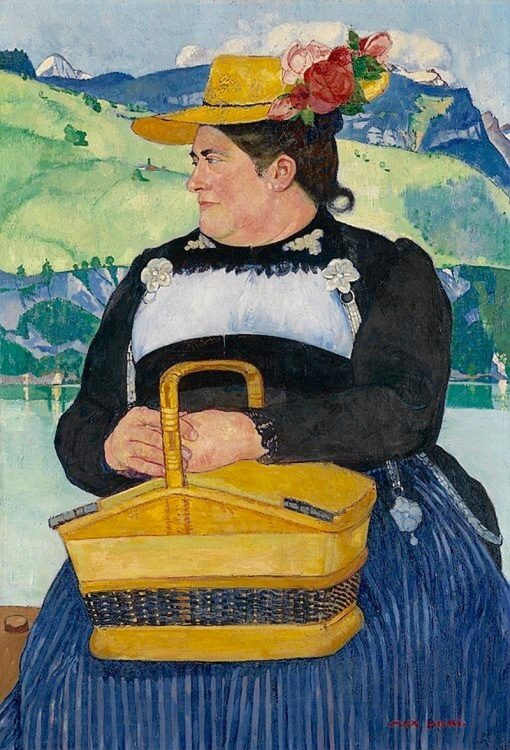
Woman with a Basket

While still engaged in his basic education, he received art lessons from the landscape painter Paul Volmar (1832-1906), in Bern. After that he attended classes given by Fritz Schider at the vocational school in Basel. In 1886, he was admitted to the Academy of Fine Arts, Munich, but was dismissed on the recommendation of Professor Karl Raupp, for laziness and lack of talent. As a result, he took private lessons from Simon Hollósy until 1889.

From there, he went to Paris and became a student at the Académie Julian. He then travelled abroad and briefly had a studio in Munich. In 1898, he returned to Switzerland, initially living in Langnau im Emmental, then settling in Brienz. For many years, he was a devoted follower of the Munich School and only developed a truly personal style around 1900, under the influence of Ferdinand Hodler.

In 1909, he was the organizer of the "First International Art Exhibition of Switzerland" at the Kursaal in Interlaken. In 1911, he was awarded the "State Prize" at the International Exhibition. The following year, an arsonist attacked his works and those by Cuno Amiet at the Kunsthaus Zürich. The case was never solved.

In 1913, he served on the art jury at the "XI Internationalen Kunstausstellung“ in the Glaspalast, Munich. The following year, he was also a judge at the "Schweizerische Landesausstellung held in Bern.

In 1915, he fell from a jetty into the Aare River in Interlaken. Although he was rescued, after a long struggle, he died from heart failure at the Hotel du Lac. A memorial exhibition was held at the Kunsthaus Zürich later that year. His painting "Woman with a Basket" sold for the unheard-of price of 15,000 Swiss Francs.

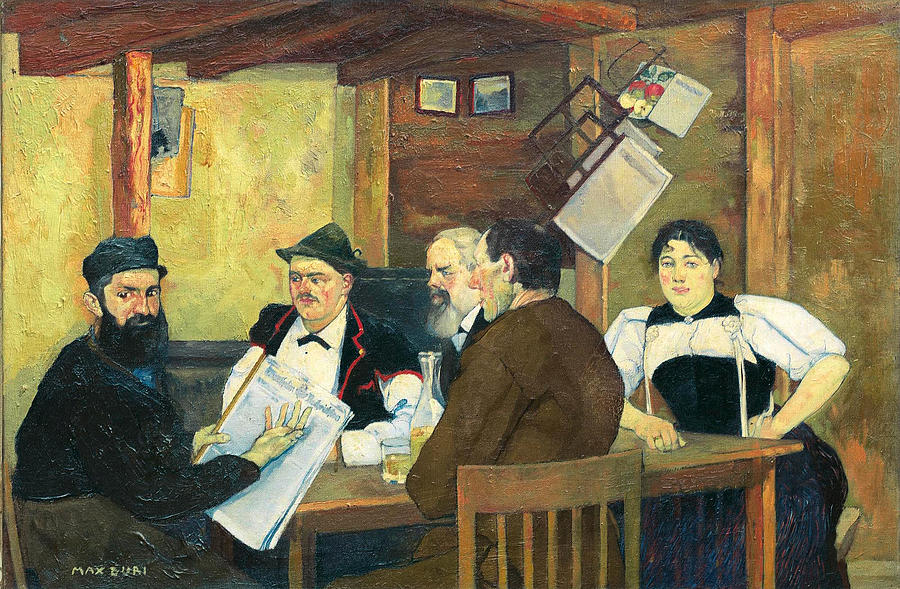
Peasants in the Local Tavern

== Sources ==
- Paul Leonhard Ganz (1957). "Buri, Max Alfred". Neue Deutsche Biographie (in German). Vol. 3. Berlin: Duncker & Humblot. pp. 51–52. (full text online).
- Hans Graber: Max Buri. Sein Leben und Werk. Schwabe, Basel 1916.
- Max Huggler: Max Buri. Der Maler von Brienz. Wyss, Bern 1981.
- Hermann Röthlisberger: Max Buri. In: Blätter für bernische Geschichte, Kunst- und Altertumskunde. Vol. 12 (1916), pg.161 ff. (Digitalisat)
- Ulrich Gerster: Max Buri und seine Zeitgenossen. Cuno Amiet, Giovanni Giacometti, Ferdinand Hodler, Edouard Vallet. Benteli, Wabern/Bern 2002, ISBN 3-7165-1269-9. (exhibition catalog).
