= Albert J. Welti =

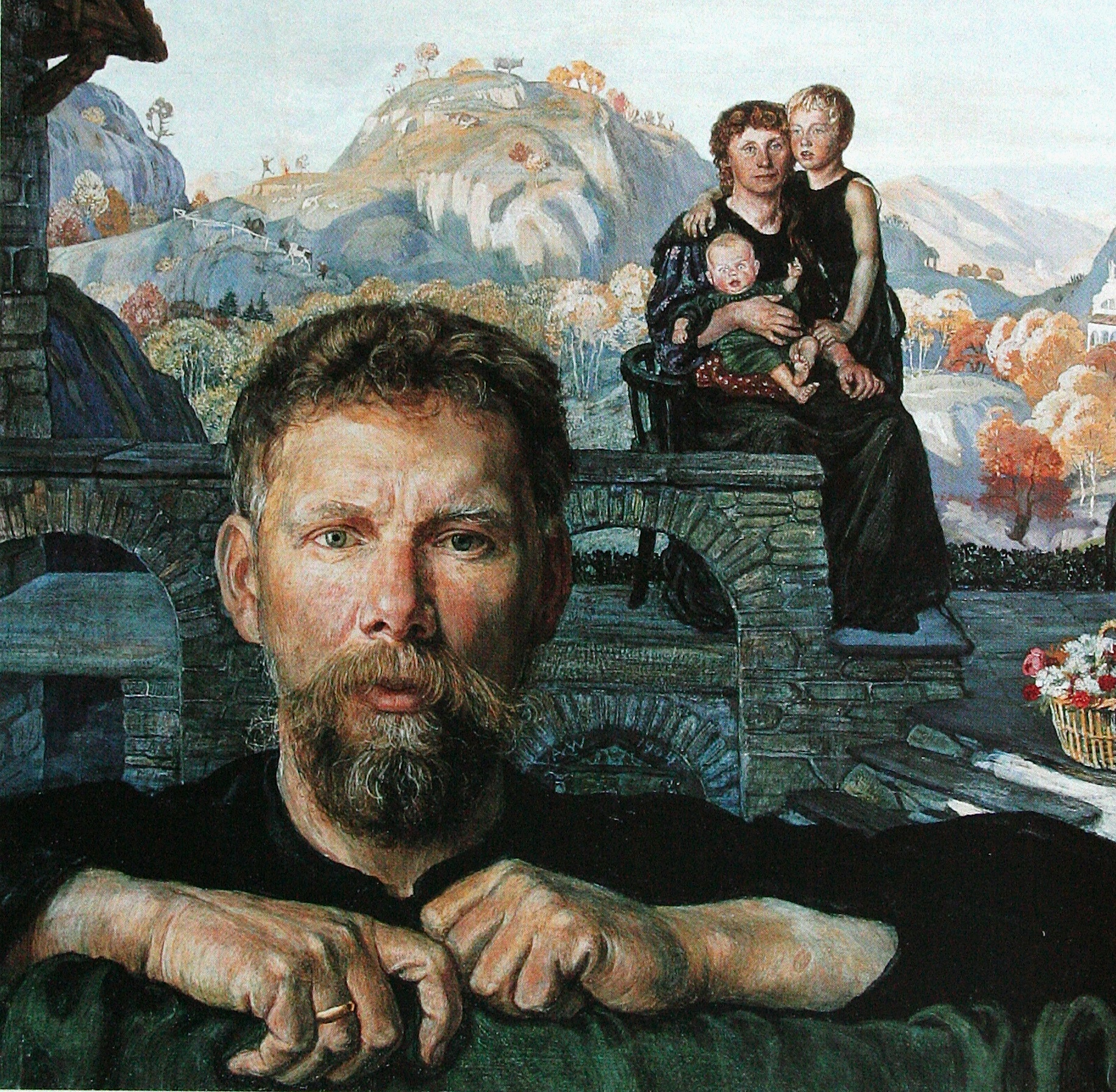
Familienbild (1903). The Welti family, with Albert in the foreground.

Albert Jakob Welti (October 11, 1894 – December 5, 1965) was a Swiss writer and painter.

== Life ==
Welti was born in Zürich-Höngg. As a son of the famous painter Albert Welti, Albert Jakob Welti was also to be educated as an artist. He studied at the academies of arts in Düsseldorf, Munich, London, and Madrid. He lost both parents in his young days: first his mother died in 1911 in Munich, then his father in 1912 in Bern. A heavy typhus fever on the Balearic Islands in the early 1920s brought the turning point from painting to writing.

Having returned to Switzerland, he chose Chêne-Bougeries near Geneva as his place of work. Maroto und sein König, a historic play, came into being (1922), then Servet in Genf (1930). At the Swiss National Exhibition of 1939 in Zürich, the dialect drama Steibruch was premiered extremely successfully and later also made into a film. Only at the age of 50, Albert J. Welti's first novel was released: Wenn Puritaner jung sind (1941); then followed the second novel Martha und die Niemandssöhne (1948), which played in the politically and socially stirred Geneva. He continued the critical questioning of the Swiss present with a number of extensive and unconventional novels.

In a large number of essays and speeches, Welti took a stand on cultural, literary, and political questions of his time. All these large and smaller works showed him as a commentator of great intellectual independence. The last work, Bild des Vaters (1962) is a sensitive artist's portrait, which finally put him at the same level with his father. Besides other novels and plays, this author also wrote several stories and radio plays, in which the dialect often got a chance.

Albert J. Welti received a number of honors and prizes for single works by the Schweizerische Schillerstiftung (1931, 1942, and 1948) and in 1954 a prize for his complete dramatic works. From 1933 to 1965 he was in the board of the Gesellschaft Schweizerischer Dramatiker, from 1946 to 1951 he was the president of this society.

Welti died in Amriswil. The literary remains of Welti are located in the Swiss Literary Archives in Bern.

== Works ==
A selection of the most important works of Albert J. Welti:

1. Drama
  - Zerfall (ca. 1920, unprinted)
  - Maroto und sein König (1926; premiere 12 April 1926, Stadttheater Basel)
  - Der Vertrag mit dem Teufel (premiere 3 April 1929, Stadttheater St. Gallen)
  - Servet in Genf (1930; premiere 7 November 1931, Stadttheater Bern)
  - Blaubart (1933; premiere 28 January 1937, Schauspielhaus Zürich)
  - Das Friedenskind (1934)
  - Mordnacht (1937; premiere 23 February 1937 by the Freie Bühne Zürich in the Stadttheater Winterthur)
  - Steibruch (1939; premiere 7 May 1939, Landi Zürich 1939)
  - Summerfahrt (also: Miss Helvetia, 1941, premiere 4 November 1941 by the Freie Bühne Zürich in the Schauspielhaus Zürich)
  - Inserat 82793 (1942)
  - Aberglauben (1945, premiere 27 October 1945, Schaffhausen)
  - Prinz Georg und die würgende Demut (1947)
  - Es Defizit oder: Di missverschtanden Abchürzig (1948)
  - Ramon Lull (1949; premiere 28 November 1951, Stadttheater St. Gallen)
  - Sie aber hat’s nicht leicht gehabt (1950)
  - Hiob der Sieger (1954; premiere 3 March 1955, Schauspielhaus Zürich)
  - Züriputsch (1961; created 1938)
2. Festspiel
  - Distelschnauz (also: Schpiil ums Füür, premiere Bern 1928)
  - Huusreuki (Festspiel zum 300-jährigen Zunfthausjubiläum der Zunft zur Waag Zürich, 1937)
  - Hie Schaffhausen! (1939; premiere 29 July 1939, Landi Zürich 1939)
  - Ragazer Brunnenspiel (1939; premiere 8 June 1968 in Bad Ragaz)
  - Helfende Kräfte (1945; premiere 2 June 1945, Winterthur)
  - Der Pass (1948)
  - Hans Büezer und die Musen (1948; premiere 8 July 1948, Schweiz. Fest der Arbeiterchöre Genf 1948)
  - Schaffhauser Bundesspiel (premiere 13 August 1951, Schaffhausen).
3. Prose
  - Wenn Puritaner jung sind (novel, Zürich 1941)
  - Die Heilige von Tenedo (story, Zürich 1943)
  - Martha und die Niemandssöhne (novel, Zürich 1948)
  - Die kühle Jungfrau Hannyvonne (novel, Zürich 1954)
  - Der Dolch der Lucretia (novel, Zürich 1958)
  - Bild des Vaters (biography, Zürich 1962)
4. Radio plays
  - Ludwig XIV. oder Büro SOS (radio play, Studio Zürich 1941)
  - Steibruch (radio play version in five episodes, Studio Zürich 3 February 1942)
  - Die Wolfsmilchwirtschaft (radio play, Studio Bern 1943)
  - Mordnacht (radio play, Studio Zürich, 19 December 1950)
  - Servet in Genf (radio play, Studio Bern 15 October 1953)
  - Das Haus zum wechselnden Mond (Hörfolge, Studio Bern 17 December 1956)

== Literature ==
- Albert J. Welti, Reto Caluori (editor): "Steibruch" und andere Texte. Bern (Paul Haupt) 2002, 254 pages, ISBN 3-258-06343-5
