= Franz Zell =

German architect and folklorist

Franz Anton Zell (28 February 1866 in Munich - 10 August 1961) was a German architect and folklorist.
