= Albert Welti =

Swiss artist

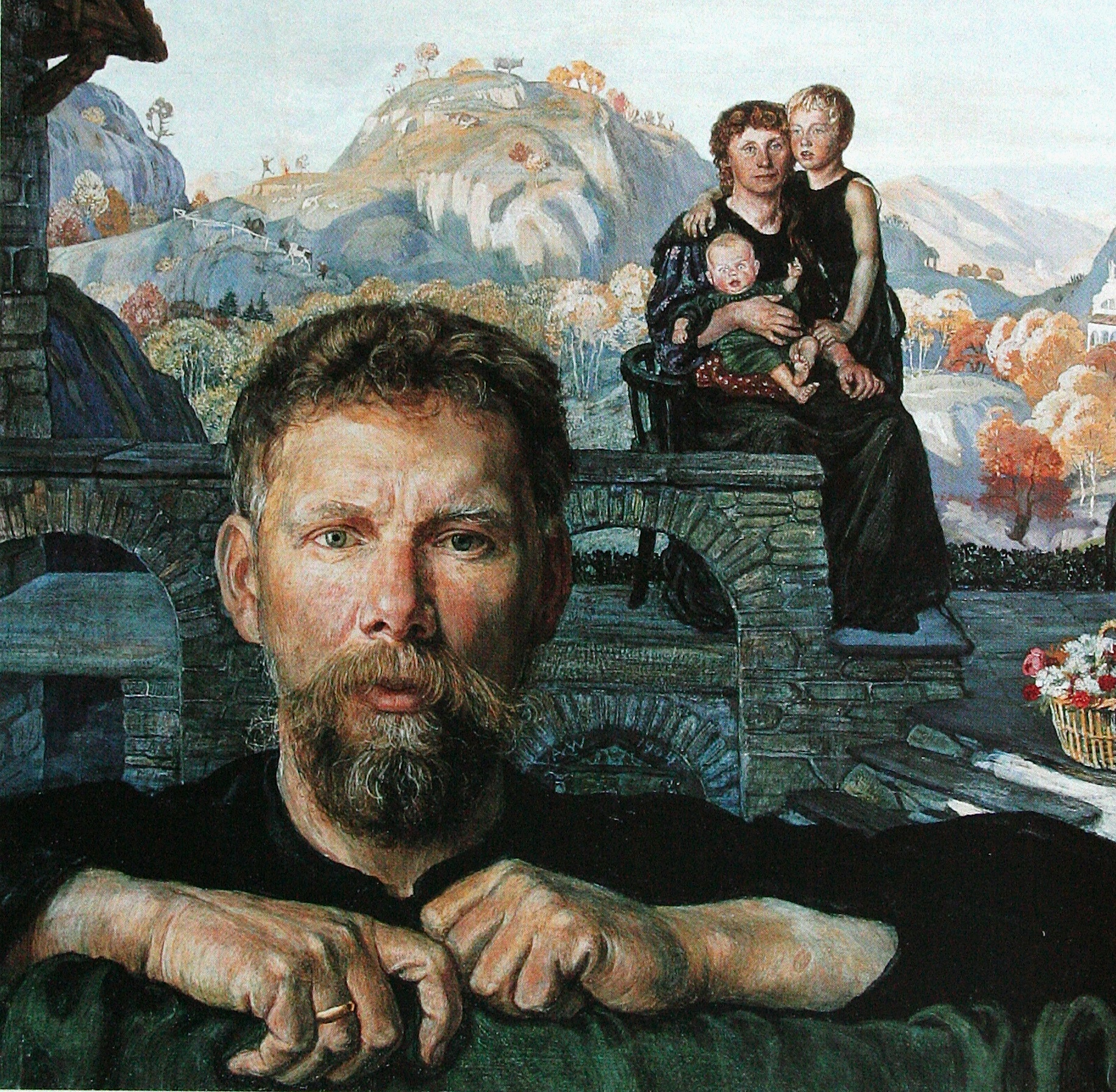
Self-portrait with his family (1903)

Albert Welti (18 February 1862 – 7 June 1912) was a Swiss painter and etcher. Many of his works depicted dreams or nightmares.

== Biography ==
Welti was born in Zurich as the oldest of seven children of Jakob Albert Welti-Furrer (1833-1906), a hauler, and Anna Barbara Furrer. Part of the French Armée de l'Est was billeted on his grandfather's property in 1871, and watching their activities inspired his later interest in historical scenes.

After completing his primary education, Welti attended the local Industrieschule, where he studied engraving with Johann Conrad Werdmüller. In 1880, he began a photography apprenticeship with his uncle Oswald Welti (1843-1932) in Lausanne, but stayed with him for only one year, enrolling at the Academy of Fine Arts, Munich in 1882. After returning to Zurich in 1886, he became an student and assistant of painter Arnold Böcklin, who would become his main influence. Welti worked at Böcklin's studio until 1891, when he began his career as an independent artist.

In 1894, Welti married Emmeline Wildbolz. They settled in the outskirts of Munich the next year, where Welti opened a studio. He regularly travelled to Switzerland, and after his father's death, Welti assuaged his grief by visiting Innertkirchen and Vättis, where he created numerous pastel nature studies. After that, he worked in Munich until 1908. While there, he became friends with the author Hermann Hesse.

His wife died, suddenly, in 1911. Welti died a year later in Bern, aged 50. His country home in Ostermundigen, near Bern, was bought by Hesse. His work was part of the painting event in the art competition at the 1924 Summer Olympics. His son, Albert Jakob Welti also became an artist and an author. The singer-songwriter Sophie Hunger is his grand niece.

== Works ==
Welti's best known work is probably the large fresco Die Landsgemeinde, in the meeting room of the Council of States at the Federal Palace, which was commissioned by the Swiss government in 1908. After his death in 1912, the work was completed by Wilhelm Balmer in 1914. In addition to his art, he also designed postage stamps for the Swiss Post.

=== Selected works ===
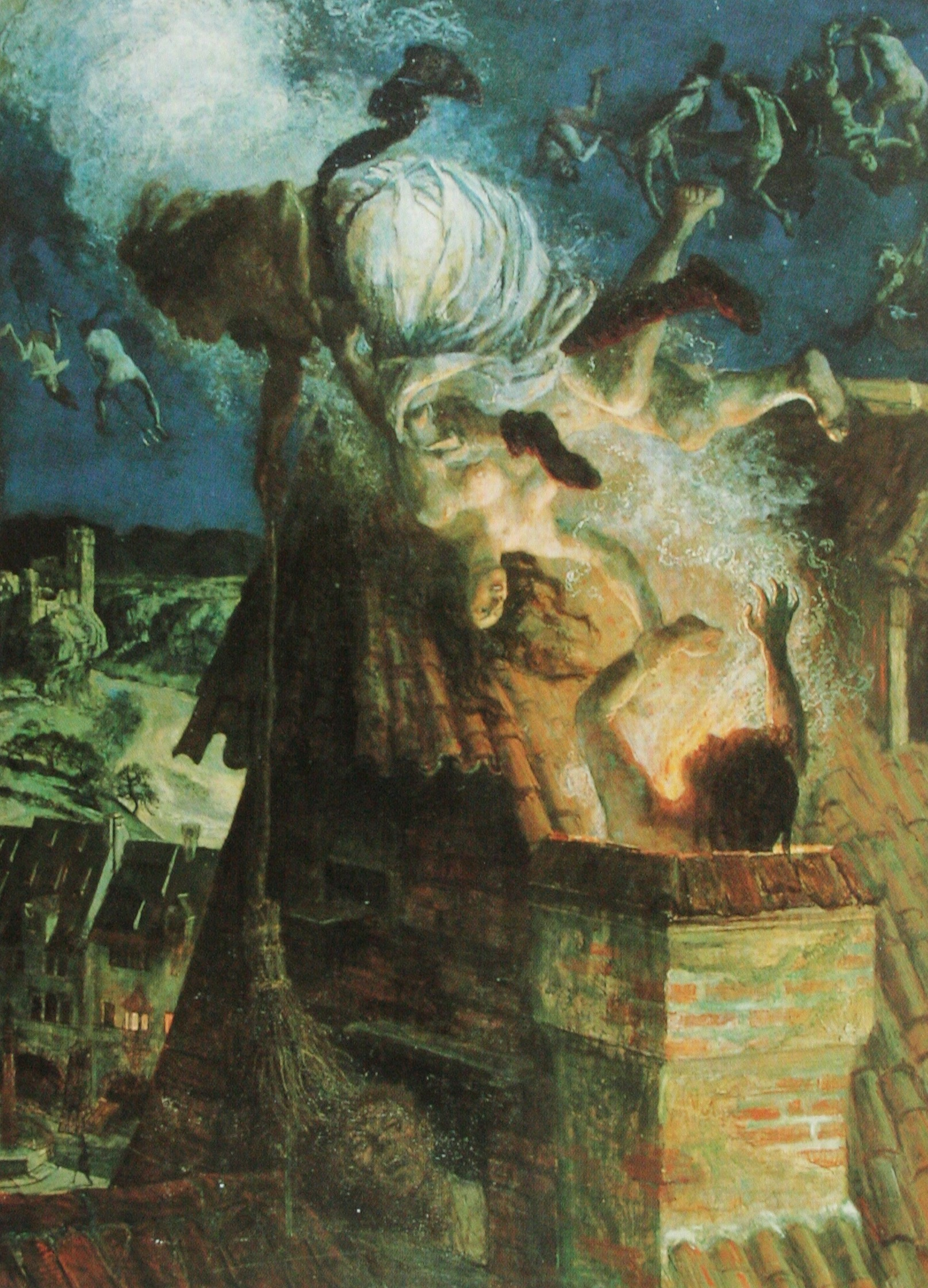
Walpurgis Night

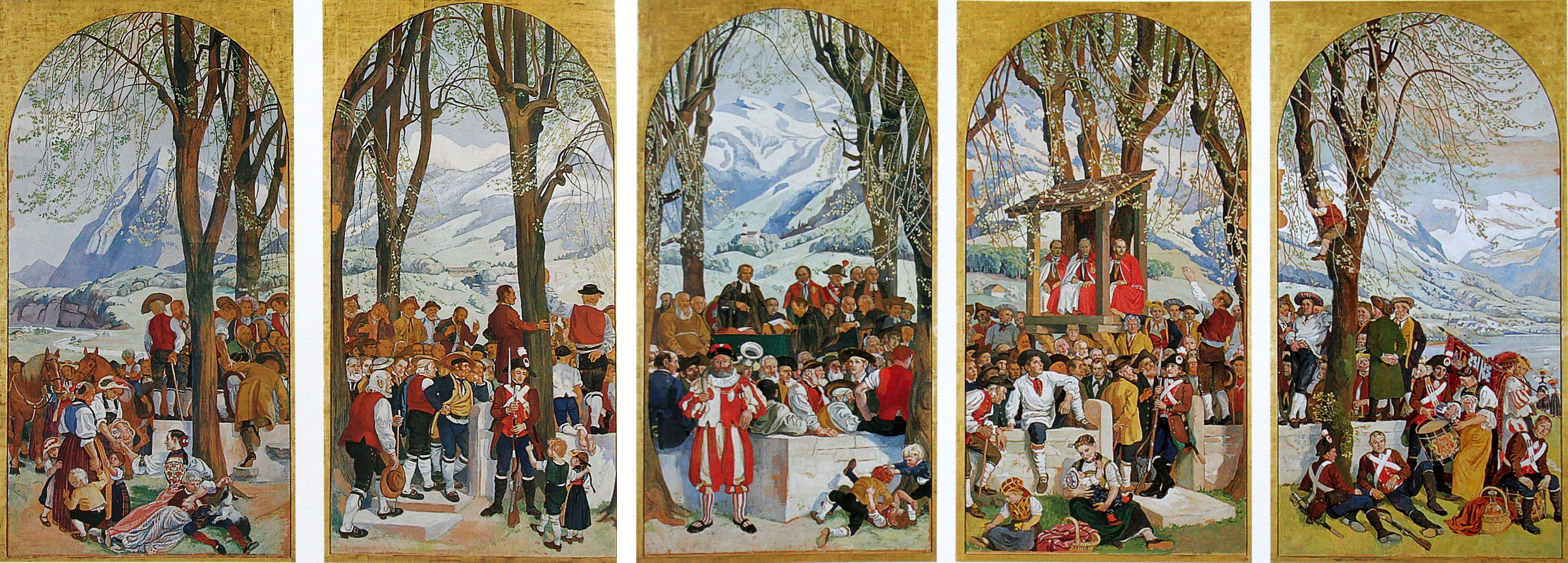
Die Landesgemeinde

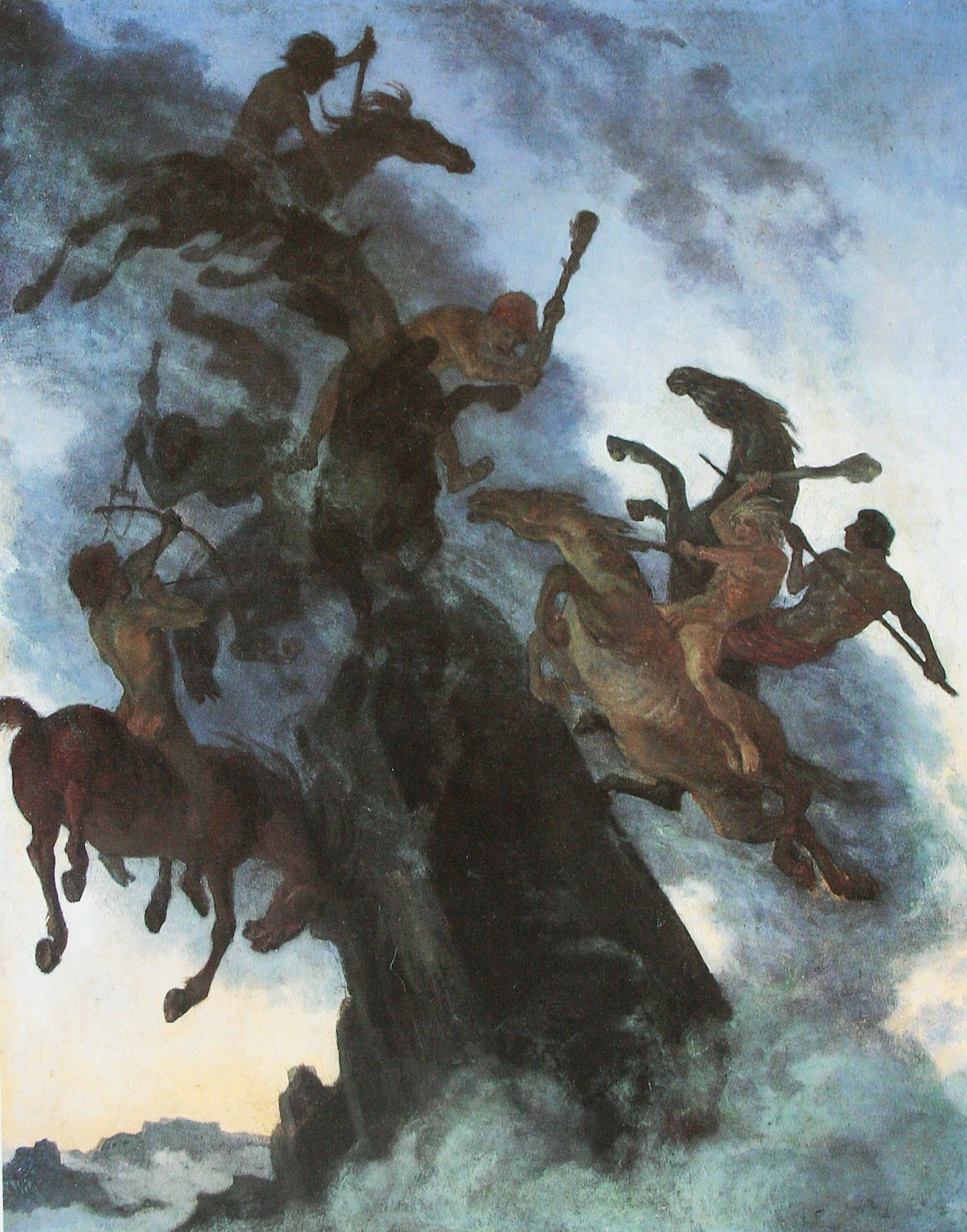
Fog Rider
