= Wilhelm Balmer =

Swiss painter

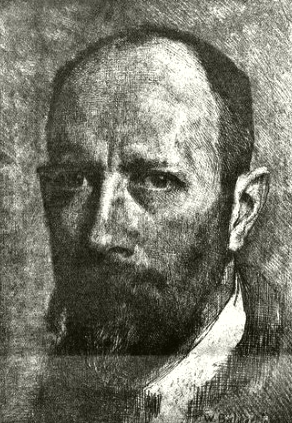
Self-portrait

Paul Friedrich Wilhelm Balmer (1865–1922) was a painter from Basel.

He was born in Basel as the son of mathematician Johann Jakob Balmer. He was educated in draughtsmanship under Fritz Schnider and later at the Academy of Fine Arts in Munich under Ludwig von Löfftz. During 1887–1892, he spent time abroad in Paris, London, Rome and in the Netherlands. During 1897–1902 he lived in Munich, and during 1902–1908 in Florence and after 1908 in Bern where he collaborated with his friend Albert Welti, completing Welti's monumental Landsgemeinde fresco for the Federal Palace of Switzerland after Welti's death in 1912.
