= Jan Trepczyk =

Kashubian writer, lexicographer, and activist (1907–1989)

- Jón Trepczik
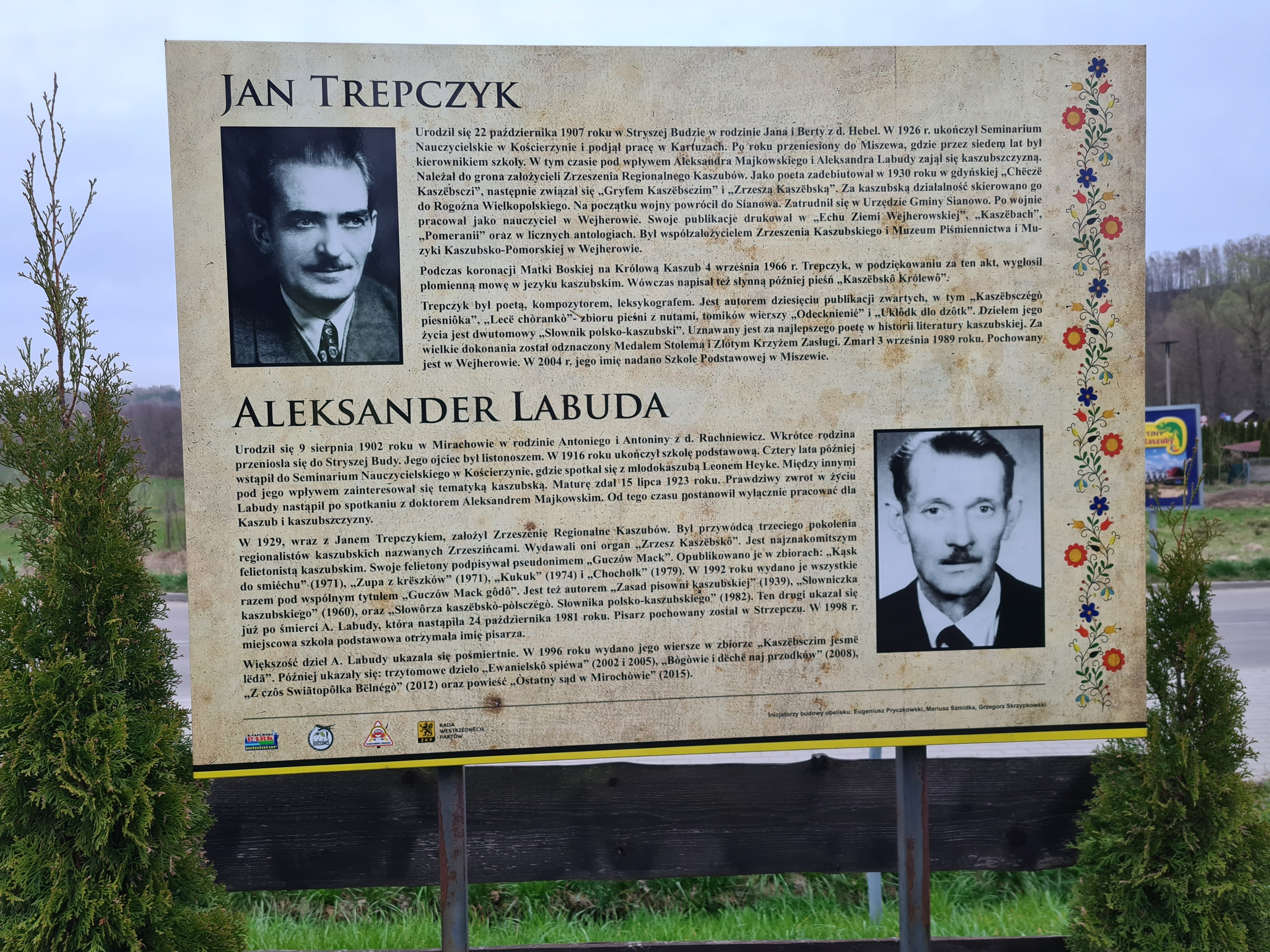
- Information board about Trepczyk in Strysza Buda
- Born: October 22, 1907; Strëszô Bùda, German Empire
- Died: September 3, 1989 (aged 81); Wejrowò, Poland
- Occupation: Teacher
- Era: 20th century
- Organisations: Kashubian–Pomeranian Association; Regionalné Zrzeszenié Kaszëbów; Polish Writers' Union
- Known for: Promoting Kashubian language and culture
- Notable work: Słownik Polsko-Kaszubski
- Spouse: Leokadia Czaja
- Parents: Jan (father); Berta née Hebel (mother)
- Awards: Order of Poland Restored (Polonia Restituta) (Cavalier) Golden "Cross of Merit" (Poland)

Jan Trepczyk (Kashubian: Jón Trepczik; 22 October 1907 in Strysza Buda, Kartuzy – 3 September 1989, in Wejherowo, Poland) was a Kashubian poet, songwriter, ideologist, lexicographer, and teacher. He was a member of the Regional Kashub Association of Kartuzy, of the Zrzeszeńcy (associationists), and of the Kashubian–Pomeranian Association. He compiled a Polish-Kashubian dictionary and co-founded the Museum of Kashubian and Pomeranian Writing and Music in Wejherowo.

== Early years ==
Born as the youngest of the five children to farmers Jan and Berta (maiden name: Hebel), between 1914 and 1921 he attended elementary school in Mirachowo (first in German, later in the Polish language). It was where he met Aleksander Labuda for the first time. In 1921, he entered the state run teacher's seminary for males in Kościerzyna. Here, one of his teachers was the priest Leon Heyke, who instilled in Trepczyk a lasting interest in Kashubian culture. Following his graduation, Trepczyk started teaching at an elementary school in Kartuzy. In 1927, he accepted a teaching position in Miszewo, near Żukowo.

During the summer of 1928, together with Aleksander Labuda, he paid Aleksander Majkowski a visit, and the latter soon became Trepczyk's spiritual mentor. Along with Labuda and A. Stoltmann, Trepczyk organized a teachers' conference in Kartuzy which culminated in the establishment of the regional Association of the Kashubians. Elected its secretary, he later became one of the most active members of the Zrzeszeńcy organization. In 1930, Trepczyk married Jan Rompski's sister Aniela, with whom he fathered Bogusława, Mirosława, Damroka, Sława, Świętopełek, and Mestwin. Also in 1930, he debuted as an author in the Chëcz Kaszëbskô periodical, concurrently publishing in Grif Kaszëbsczi and Zrzësz Kaszëbskô (later becoming its editor in chief.)

In 1934, Trepczyk was ordered to move to Rogoźno and a year later, to Tłukawy in Wielkopolska, as a result of the Polish government's attempt to weaken the local Kashubian establishment accused of separatist tendencies. While "banned" he released a tome of Kashubian songs; continuously publishing, he remained committed to his views on Kashubian matters.

== World War II ==
September 1939 found Trepczyk in Tłukawy, where he was sentenced to live and work. In the summer of 1940, he returned to Kashubia, accepting a job as a cashier at Sianowo's administration office. In Italy he associated with an Italian resistance unit. Later he joined the ranks of General Władysław Anders' Polish Army.

== Personal life, work and Kashubian activism ==
In June 1946, he returned to Kashubia and resided in Wejherowo (first on Bukowa St., then Kopernika St.) Here, for 20 years he worked as a music teacher in the elementary school (school no. 4.). Apart from music, he also taught geography, arts, and mathematics. In 1951, following the death of his wife Adela, he married Leokadia Czaja, becoming a stepfather to her daughter, Zofia. He retired in 1967 and two years later moved to a new house on Zwycięstwa Street. He lived there with some of his family members until he died.

Following his post-World War II return to Kashubia Trepczyk supported local cultural and social affairs. He continued publishing in Zrzesz Kaszëbskô, Echo Ziemi Wejherowskiej, Kaszëbë, and later also in Pomerania and a few other periodicals. He wrote short novels and sketches, but chiefly poems and songs featuring his own and other authors' lyrics. Albeit better known for his singing skills, he also played piano and violin. Between 1952 and 1954, he collected relics of Kashubian culture in villages and towns. While focusing on Kashubian literature and language (along with its grammar and vocabulary), he put forth an effort to normalize its spelling.

In December 1965, while supporting the task of organizing the Kashubian-Pomeranian Association, Trepczyk became president of its Wejherowo chapter. Finding for it a suitable downtown location, he expanded its engagement to include drama, music, lectures, and exhibitions. He asked to be relieved from his position at the Kashubian-Pomeranian Association in 1961, following the accusations of holding separatist sentiments and sympathizing with German revisionists. Consequently, the organization he helped to establish, issued him a formal reprimand, thus temporarily crippling his cultural and artistic endeavors. Still, Trepczyk continued to write poetry and songs, patronizing the Wejherowo Sea Song Festival, instituting choirs and folklore groups, and striving to establish the Kashubian-Pomeranian museum in Wejherowo. In 1967, he was awarded the "Stolem Medal" and in 1971, Poland's Golden Cross of Merit. He was harassed by the Polish Security Service. Rehabilitated to his former position at the Kashubian-Pomeranian Association, he led it for two more cadences (1967–1973).

=== Period of greatest activity ===
In the 1970s, for the first time after World War II, Trepczyk resumed publishing. He commenced with a volume of poems Mòja stegna (1970) followed by two song collections based on the work of a Lębork-native musician, Juliusz Mowiński, entitled Rodnô Zemia (1974). He published Mòja chëcz in 1978, and the children's rhymes called Ukłôdk dlô dzôtk in 1975. However, his main accomplishment of this period was a substantial volume of poetry titled "Òdecknieni", published in 1977 and consisting of more than 80 poems. The preface to the book was written by Tadeusz Bolduan, with Trepczyk's biography added by Edmund Puzdrowski. In 1979, Trepczyk became a member of the Polish Writers Association. In 1980, his Ukłôdk dlô dzôtk was republished, and the celebrated song collection Lecë choranko containing more than 80 songs was issued. Works by Trepczyk were also added to several anthologies, including the Kaschubische Anthologie (1973). In 1979, the author was honored by the publication of Pasja twórczego życia, dedicated to Marian Mokwa and Aleksander Labuda. At the end of 1986, Trepczyk became an honorary member of the Kashubian-Pomeranian Association.

Trepczyk's late years were spent very fruitfully. He kept writing poems, songs, and memoirs while continuing publishing. He conducted various choruses, often performing solo or in small groups with his wife, daughter Zofia, and son-in-law, Edmund Kamiński. He completed his great Polish-Kashubian Dictionary and was looking for a publisher (unfortunately he did not live to see the publication.) He claimed that Kashubian is a distinct language. He was also a translator of German texts into Kashubian language. Suffering from laryngeal cancer, he relied on a voice amplifier. In addition, toward the end of his life, he also suffered from shingles. He died suddenly on 3 September 1989 in Wejherowo, where he also is buried. His wife Leokadia died almost 10 years later, on 28 November 1998.

== Legacy ==
Jan Trepczyk is known to have been a very active contributor to Kashubian culture. Trepczyk's song collection consists of 133 recognized songs arranged mostly by Juliusz Mowiński and Zbigniew Szablewski.

Słownik Polsko-Kaszubski was published post mortem in 1994. It contains about 60 thousand entries and contains an addendum written by prof. Jerzy Treder. Republished in 1997, in its augmented version, was Trepczyk's song collection "Lecë choranko" accompanied by an audio cassette including 27 songs while in 2004 some of these songs were released on a CD entitled "Mòrze: Kaszubskie piesni o morzu." On 18 June 2004, Miszewo Elementary School, were Trepczyk had been a teacher for seven years, was given his name. Similarly, the Wejherowo Singing Association added Trepczyk's name as an integral part of its name designation. In fact, the Wejherowo Singing Association's debut performance took place in Miszewo during the school's name change ceremony.

Streets in Wejherowo, Rumia, and Bolszewo have been renamed to commemorate Trepczyk; he is also present in newspapers and periodicals. In 2008, his biography was released in "Feliks Marszalkowski i inni Zrzeszincy a rozwój jezyka oraz literatury kaszubskiej." The 20th Sea Song Festival was the justification to the release of Trepczyks' two song collections arranged for solo vocalist and chorus ("Hej mòrze, mòrze" and "Marika"). At the same time an anthology was released, titled "Jubileusz Ogólnopolskich Festiwali Piesni o Morzu w Wejherowie (1966–2008)", summing the songs performed at various festivals with the sea theme. A comprehensive biography of the author is being prepared by E. Kamiński. He has made important contributions to the revival of Kashubian as a written language, and greatly influenced the cultural milieu in Kashubia.

== Publications ==
- Kaszebskji pjesnjôk. Dzél I, Rogoźno Wlkp. 1935 (32 songs)
- Moja stegna, Gdańsk 1970 (28 poems)
- Rodnô Zemia, Gdańsk 1974 (songs arr. by Juliusz Mowiński)
- Ukłôdk dlô dzôtk, Gdańsk 1975 (9 songs)
- Odecknienié, Gdańsk 1977
- Moja chëcz, Gdańsk 1978 (5 songs arr. by Juliusz Mowiński)
- Lecë choranko, Gdańsk 1980 (85 songs)
- Ukłôdk dlô dzôtk, Gdańsk 1980 (reprint)
- Słownik polsko-kaszubski, Gdańsk 1994
- Lecë choranko. Pieśni kaszubskie, Wejherowo 1997 (extended release accompanied by audio cassette)
- Hej mòrze, mòrze. Zbiór pieśni 1, Wejherowo 2008
- Marika. Zbiór pieśni 2, Wejherowo 2008

His works were part of following anthologies:

- Modra struna (1973)
- Swięti dzél dësze: antologia kaszubskiej poezji religijnej, zebrał i przygot. do druku wraz z przedm. Jan Walkusz (1981)

== See also ==
- Kashubians
- Kashubian language
- Slovincian
- Pomerania

== Bibliography ==
Most sources are in Polish.

- (anon) Feliks Marszałkowski i inni Zrzeszińcy a rozwój języka oraz literatury kaszubskiej, Wejherowo, 2008.
- (anon, ed.) Mësla dzecka. Antologiô kaszëbsczich wiérztów dlô dzôtków i młodzëznë, Banino 2001 (biography).
- B. Augustowski (ed.): Pojezierze Kaszubskie (praca zbiorowa), Gdańsk: GTN, 1979, p. 407 (English summary).
- L. Bądkowski, Zarys historii literatury kaszubskiej Gdańsk, 1959, 2006.
- T. Bolduan, Nie dali się złamać. Spojrzenie na ruch kaszubski 1939–1995, Gdańsk 1996.
- T. Bolduan, Nowy bedeker kaszubski, Gdańsk 1997, 2002.
- A. Bukowski (opr.), Literatura polska, t. I-II, Warszawa 1984–1985.
- J. Drzeżdżon, Współczesna literatura kaszubska 1945–1980, Warszawa 1986.
- G. Stone, Slav outposts in Central European history : the Wends, Sorbs and Kashubs, London, UK : Bloomsbury Academic, an imprint of Bloomsbury Publishing Plc, 2016
- E. Kamiński (opr.), Pasja twórczego życia, Wejherowo 1979 (życiorys).
- E. Kamiński, Jubileusz Ogólnopolskich Festiwali Pieśni o Morzu w Wejherowie (1966–2008), Wejherowo 2008.
- J. Kutta, Druga Rzeczpospolita i Kaszubi 1920–1939, Bydgoszcz 2003.
- F. Neureiter, Geschichte der Kaschubische Literatur ("History of Kashubian Literature"), München 1978, 1991 (in German).
- F. Neureiter, Historia literatury kaszubskiej. Próba zarysu, Gdańsk 1982.
- C. Obracht-Prondzyński, Zjednoczeni w idei. Pięćdziesiąt lat działalności Zrzeszenia Kaszubsko-Pomorskiego (1956–2006), Gdańsk 2006.
- R. Osowicka, Bedeker wejherowski, Gdańsk 1996, 2002; Wejherowo 2006.
- R. Ostrowska & I. Trojanowska, Bedeker kaszubski, Gdańsk 1963, 1974, 1979 (short biography).
- J. Borzyszkowski, J. Mordawski, J. Treder: Historia, geografia, język i piśmiennictwo Kaszubów; J. Bòrzëszkòwsczi, J. Mòrdawsczi, J. Tréder: Historia, geògrafia, jãzëk i pismienizna Kaszëbów; pòd red. Jana Mòrdawsczégò, tołmaczënk Jerzi Tréder, Wëdowizna M. Rôżok przë wespółrobòce z Institutã Kaszëbsczim, Gduńsk 1999, ISBN 83-86608-65-X.
