= Kashubian =

Kashubian can refer to:

- Pertaining to Kashubia, a region of north-central Poland
- Kashubians, an ethnic group of north-central Poland
- Kashubian language

== See also ==
- Kashubian alphabet
- Kashubian Landscape Park
- Kashubian studies
