= Florian Ceynowa =

Polish politician and academic (1817–1881)

- Florión Cenôwa
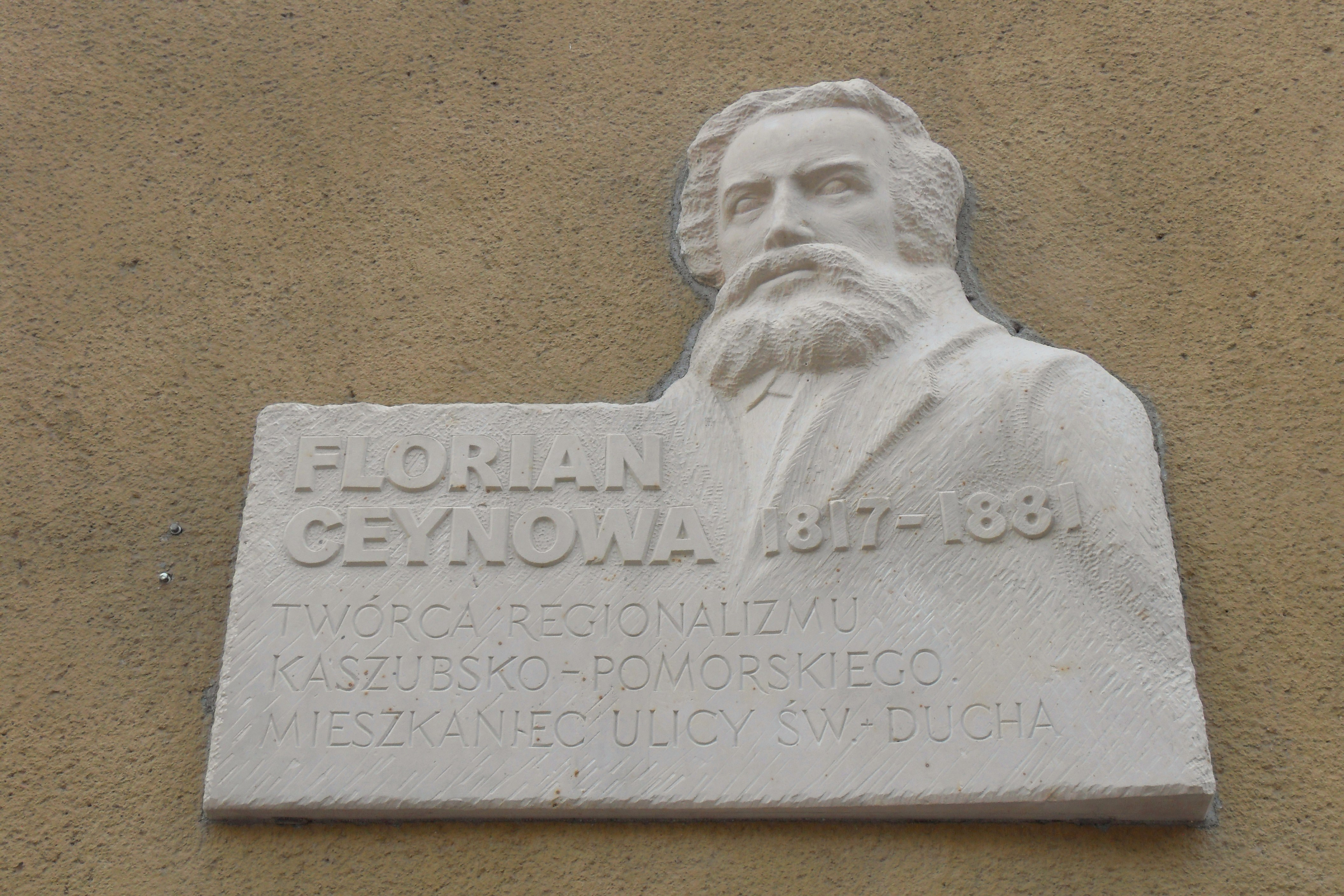
- A mounted bust of Ceynowa in Gdańsk
- Born: Florian Stanisław Wenanty Ceynowa; 4 May 1817; Slawoschin, West Prussia, Kingdom of Prussia
- Died: 26 March 1881 (aged 63); Bukowitz, West Prussia, German Empire
- Movement: Pan-Slavism

Florian Stanisław Ceynowa (Kashubian: Florión Stanisłôw Wenanti Cenôwa; 4 May 1817 – 26 March 1881) was a medical doctor, political activist, writer, and linguist. He was a pioneer of the nationalist movement among the Kashubian people in the mid-19th century. Ceynowa undertook efforts to identify the Kashubian language, culture and traditions. He and Alexander Hilferding were not the only ones to study the language and legends of the Kashubians, but they had the greatest influence and prompted others to take up investigations. The individual nature of the Kashubian character and language was first described by Hilferding, to whom we are indebted for the first data about the range of Kashubian dialects. In 1856, he and Ceynowa traveled to the Kashubia. He awakened Kashubian self-identity, thereby opposing Germanisation and Prussian authority, and Polish nobility and clergy. He believed in a separate Kashubian identity and strove for a Russian-led pan-Slavic federation. He strove to create a program aimed at the introduction of a Kashubian standard in grammar, pronunciation and spelling, based on the spirit of the 1848 Revolution. He compiled treatises on Kashubian grammar and published Kashubian texts along with their translations into other Slavic languages. An important person for Kashubian literature, he was also a translator of Russian texts into Kashubian language.

== Biography ==
=== Early life and education ===
Ceynowa was born in Slawoschin in 1817, the eighth of nine children to a family of farmers. His formal education began at the village school before he attended the gymnasium in Konitz. He then went on to study medicine at the Silesian Friedrich Wilhelm University in Breslau, followed by the University of Königsberg in 1843.

=== Kociewian uprising ===
In January 1846 Ceynowa had been put under house arrest in Königsberg by the Prussian authorities. The following month he fled the city to the Kociewian village of Klonówka from where he planned to lead an uprising against the Prussian authorities in the regional capital of Preußisch Stargard. Ceynowa had gathered a force of around 100 Kosynierzy, however, the Prussian garrison in Preußisch Stargard had been warned about the attack, leaving Ceynowa no choice but to abandon the plan and go into hiding. Ceynowa was arrested in Kashubia the following month whilst travelling between the villages of Sianowo and Staniszewo. From there he was imprisoned at Moabit where he was sentenced to death by decapitation, although this was later commuted to life imprisonment. Ceynowa was eventually freed by a crowd of protestors at the start of the March Revolution, and an amnesty was granted. Whilst in prison he authored the first literary work in the Kashubian language, Rozmowa Pòlocha z Kaszëbą.

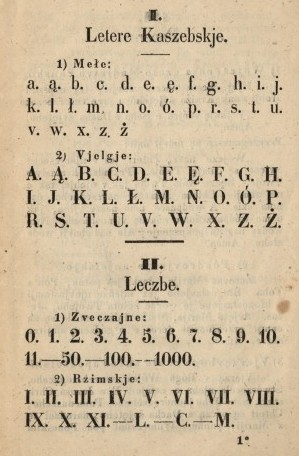
An earlier version of Ceynowa's Kashubian alphabet, which dates back to 1850

== Works ==
- De terrae Pucensis incolarum superstitione in re medica: dissertatio inauguralis medica / quam ... publice defendet auctor Florianus Ceynowa, Berlin: Schlesinger, 1851, no ISBN.
- Xążeczka dlo Kaszebov przez Wójkasena, Danzig: 1850, no ISBN
- Kurze Betrachtungen über die kaßubische Sprache, als Entwurf zur Grammatik, ed., introd. and comm. by Aleksandr Dmitrievič Duličenko and Werner Lehfeldt, Göttingen: Vandenhoeck & Ruprecht, 1998, (=Abhandlungen der Akademie der Wissenschaften zu Göttingen, Philologisch-Historische Klasse; series 3, No. 229), ISBN 3-525-82501-3.
- "Mały zbiór wyrazów kaszubskich maja̜cych wie̜ksze podobieństwo w je̜zyku rosyjskim aniżeli w je̜zyku polskim" [Parallel title: 'Eine kleine Sammlung kaschubischer Wörter, welche eine größere Ähnlichkeit mit rußischen als mit der polnischen Sprache haben'; Kashubian] (Danzig: ^{1}1850), Hanna Popowska-Taborska (ed.), in: Uwagi o Kaszubszczyźnie, Jerzy Treder (ed.) on behalf of the Muzeum Piśmiennictwa i Muzyki Kaszubsko-Pomorskiej, Wejherowo: Muzeum Piśmiennictwa i Muzyki Kaszubsko-Pomorskiej, ^{2}2001, (=Biblioteka kaszubska), ISBN 83-911638-6-5 / 83-88487-75-2.
- Sbjor pjesnj svjatovih, ktòre lud skovjanjskj vkròlestvje pruskjm spjevacj lubj, vidal, Schwetz: J. Hauste, 1878, no ISBN.
- Sto frartovek a potudrovéj czéscj Pomorza Kaszubśkjego, osoblivje z zjemj Svjeckjèj, Krajmi, Koczevja i Boròv, Schwetz: no year, no ISBN.
- Zarés do grammatiki kašébsko-slovjnskje mòvé [Parallel title: 'Entwurf zur Grammatik der kassubisch-slovinischen Sprache'; Kashubian], Posen: Simon, 1879, no ISBN.

== Bibliography ==
- J. Drzeżdżon, Współczesna literatura kaszubska 1945-1980, Warszawa 1986
- G. Stone, Slav outposts in Central European history : the Wends, Sorbs and Kashubs, London, UK : Bloomsbury Academic, an imprint of Bloomsbury Publishing Plc, 2016, pp. 233-6,287
- Jerzy Treder: Kashubian to Polish. Language Contacts
