= Stefan Ramułt =

Polish scholar, linguist

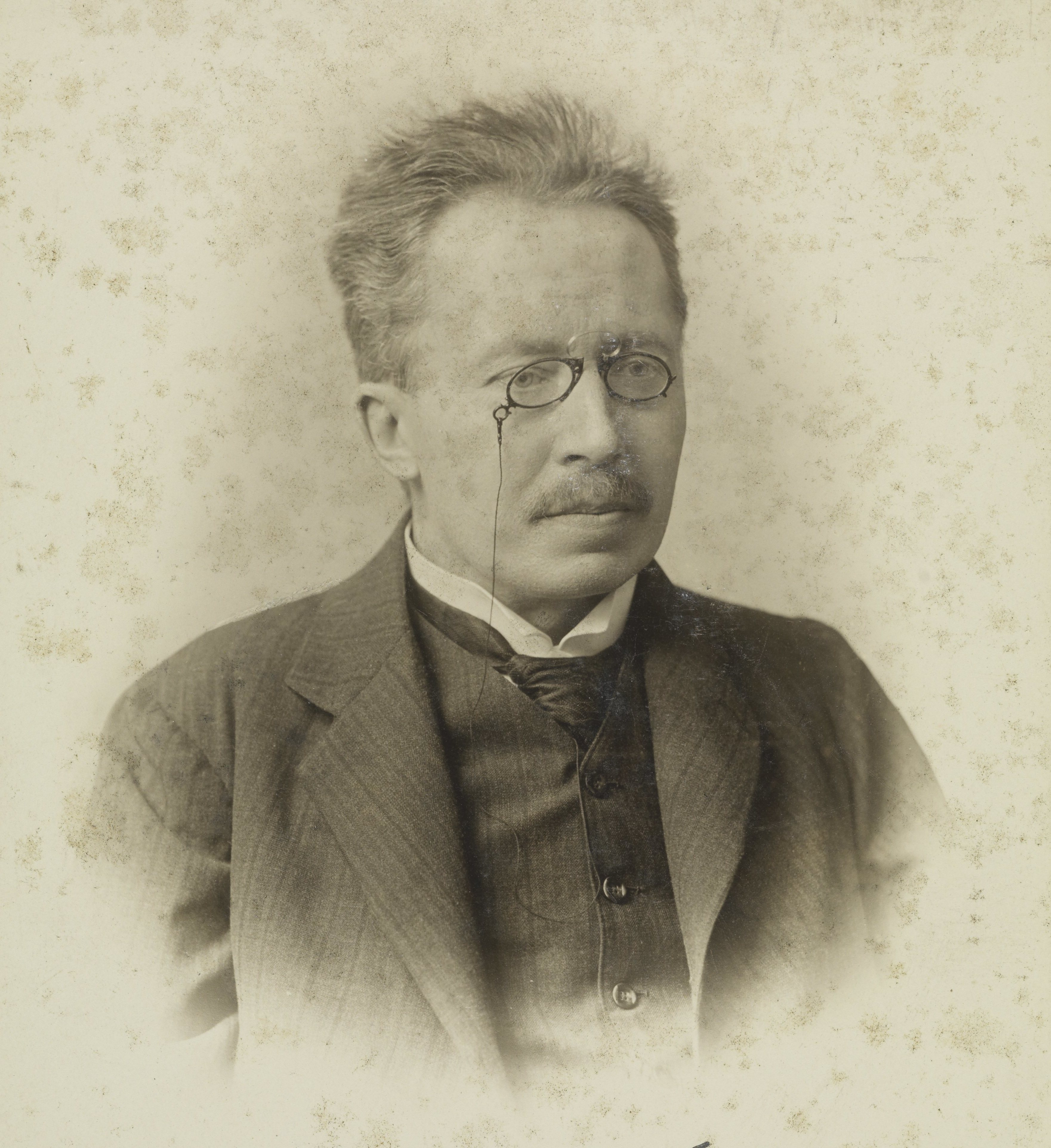
Stefan Ramułt in 1913

Stefan Ramułt (22 December 1859 – 24 December 1913) was a Polish scholar who specialized in the language and culture of the Kashubians.

In the winter of 1873-1874, Ramułt fell into a pond, causing a long-term illness and ailments which lasted for the rest of his life. During his convalescence he read Florian Ceynowa's work on the Kashubian language and culture. This led to his interest in the topic, initially via independent research into the language and culture of the Kashubians. From 1871 to 1879 he studied at the gymnasium in Wadowice; from 1879 to 1883, he studied linguistics at the Faculty of Philosophy at the University of Lviv.

A Kashubian by choice if not by birth, Ramułt wrote the Dictionary of the Pomeranian or Kashubian language (Słownik języka pomorskiego, czyli kaszubskiego, Kraków 1893). It documented the Kashubian language not as a mere dialect of Polish, as Aleksander Brückner and Hieronim Derdowski had seen it, but as a distinct Slavic language, identifying the Kashubians as the only remnant of a Pomeranian people who had settled on the southern Baltic coast, separate from other Slavs. In his second great work, "Statistics of the Kashubian Population" (Statystyka ludności kaszubskiej, Kraków 1899), he traced the settlement and lives of Kashubians all around the world, including Winona, Minnesota, which he called the "Kashubian Capital of America." His total number of Kashubians in Europe was 200,217 with 130,700 living in the Americas for a total of 330,917 Kashubians around the world.

Ramułt was also a co-founder of the Lviv Folk Society and a member of the PAU Language Committee. He dreamed of settling in Kashubia, but due to his illness, his doctors advised against this. Toward the end of his life he moved from Lviv to Kraków, where his son Mirosław was a professor at the Jagiellonian University and where he worked in a room he called "Kashubia". He died there in 1913. His tombstone in Kraków's Rakowicki Cemetery bears the inscription: "Stefan Ramułt, Kashubian-Pomeranian explorer."
