= Jan Rompski =

Kashubian writer, ethnographer, and activist

- Jón Rómpsczi
- Born: December 8, 1913 (age 112); Karthaus, German Empire
- Died: December 30, 1969 (aged 56); Toruń, Poland
- Known for: Promoting Kashubian language and culture
- Board member of: Zrzesz Kaszëbskô
- Awards: Silver "Cross of Merit" (Poland) 10 Years of Peoples Poland Commemorative Medal

Academic background
- Education: Saint Mary Magdalene High School in Poznań; Nicolaus Copernicus University in Toruń
- Alma mater: Adam Mickiewicz University in Poznań
- Thesis: Opowieści ludu kaszubskiego. Odbicie rzeczywistości społecznej XIX i XX w.
- Doctoral advisor: Józef Burszta

Academic work
- Era: 20th century
- Discipline: Ethnography
- Sub-discipline: Kashubian studies
- Institutions: District Museum in Toruń

Jan Rompski (Kashubian: Jón Rómpsczi; 8 December 1913 – 30 December 1969) was a Kashubian activist, poet, writer, journalist and ethnographer. He was one of the most important people in the Zrzeszińcë movement. During World War II he belonged to the secret anti-Nazi organization Pomeranian Griffin. He was imprisoned in the Stutthof concentration camp. After the war he finished his studies at Nicolaus Copernicus University in Toruń and was strongly involved in the Kashubian movement.

== Bibliography ==
- Kiej
- Vzenjik Arkonë
- Reboce
- Za zemjã (1956)
- Pòrénk (1957),
- Roztrąbarch (1958),
- Lepszé checze (1958)
- Gãsy ùd (1959)
- Scynanié kanië (1961)
- Pomión zwonów (1970)
- Ścinanie kani. Kaszubski zwyczaj ludowy (1973)
- Wiérzte (1980)

== Sources ==
1. L. Bądkowski: Zarys historii literatury kaszubskiej, Gdańsk 1959, 2006.
2. G. Stone: Slav outposts in Central European history : the Wends, Sorbs and Kashubs, London, UK : Bloomsbury Academic, an imprint of Bloomsbury Publishing Plc, 2016.
3. J. Kurowska: Katalog rękopisów Muzeum Piśmiennictwa i Muzyki Kaszubsko-Pomorskiej w Wejherowie', tom I. Spuścizna Jana Rompskiego, Wejherowo 2005.
4. F. Neureiter: Geschichte der Kaschubischen Literatur. Versuch einer Zusammenfassenden Darstellung, Otto Sagner Verlag München 1991 (Jan Rompski pp. 178–185).
5. F. Neureiter: Historia literatury kaszubskiej. Próba zarysu, Wydawnictwo Morskie, Gdańsk 1982 – ISBN 83-00-00256-1
6. R. Osowicka: Leksykon wejherowian, Wejherowo 2008 (short biography).
