= Alexander Hilferding =

Russian linguist and folklorist (1831–1872)

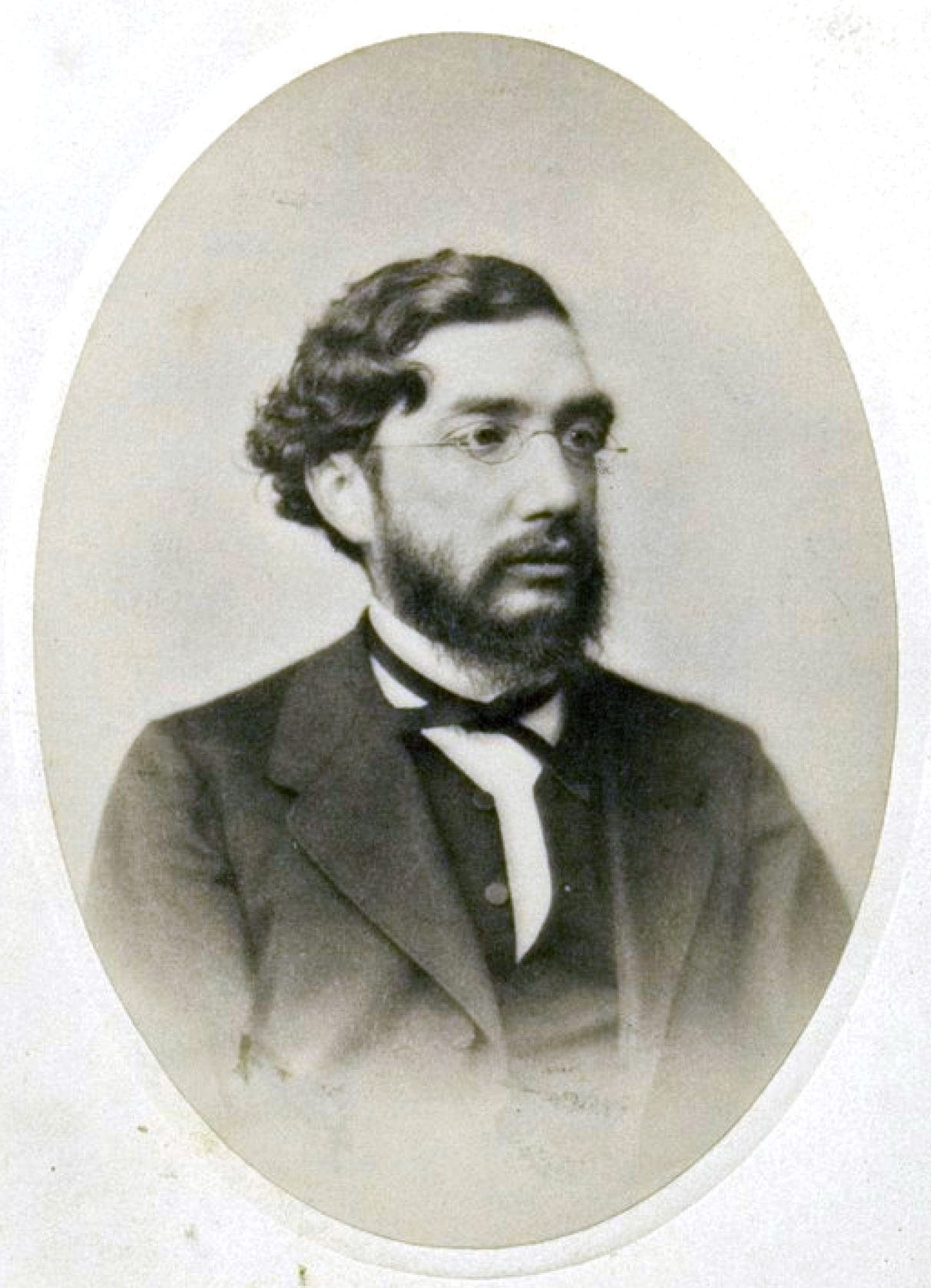
- Born: 7 February 1831; Warsaw, Congress Poland, Russian Empire
- Died: 20 June 1872 (aged 41); Kargopol, Arkhangelsk Governorate, Russian Empire
- Education: Imperial Moscow University
- Occupations: Historian; linguist; ethnographer
- Scientific career
- Workplaces: St. Petersburg Academy of Sciences

Alexander Hilferding (also spelled Aleksandar Fedorovich Giljferding; Russian: Александр Фёдорович Гильферди́нг; 14 July [O.S. 2 July] 1831 – 2 July [O.S. 20 June] 1872) was a Russian linguist and folklorist of German descent who collected some 318 bylinas in the Russian North.

A native of Warsaw, he assisted Nikolay Milyutin in reforming the administration of the Kingdom of Poland. In the late 1850s, he was a Russian diplomatic agent in Bosnia; he published several books about the country and its folklore, thanks to the collaborative efforts of Prokopije Čokorilo. Hilferding was elected into the St. Petersburg Academy of Sciences as a corresponding member in 1856. He died of typhoid while collecting folk songs in Kargopol, in the north of European Russia, and was later reburied in the Novodevichy Cemetery, St. Petersburg. Hilferding's collection of Slavonic manuscripts is preserved in the Russian National Library.

== Kashubian studies ==
Hilferding is credited with having coined the term Slovincians (Polish, Słowińcy) to describe the Lutheranized Wends of Hinter Pomerania (also sometimes called Lebakaschuben), but it seems unlikely that he actually did so. The term Slovincian evidently existed long before Hilferding's time. The Lutheran pastors Simon Krofey (1586) and Michael Pontanus (German, Brüggemann; 1643) speak of a slowinzischen language (which they call wendisch in German and—by mistaken association—vandalicus in Latin). Friederich von Dreger, Prussian Kriegs- und Domänenrat in Pomerania, wrote in 1748: “Most villages [in the region], especially in Hinter Pomerania, remain inhabited by Wends, who also still use the Wendish tongue of the peasants on the other side of the river Stolp [Polish, Słupia River], and church services are held in the same, a language wrongly called Cassubian, because Cassubians, Pomeranias, [and] Poles indeed had one language, but the actual Cassubian lands were where Belgard,. .. Neustettin, Dramburg and Schievelbein lie.” The Slovincians seem, however, to have used the name of themselves as merely a synonym for Cassubian, saying, when asked: "We are Slovincians, Slovincians and Kashubians are the same”. Florian Ceynowa and Hilferding were not the only ones to study the language and legends of the Kashubians, but they had the greatest influence and prompted others to take up investigations. The individual character of the Kashubian character and language was first described by Hilferding, to whom we are indebted for the first data about the range of Kashubian dialects. In 1856 he travelled to the Kashubia and demarcated the borders of contemporary Kashubian Pomerania. He researched the Kashubian language, describing its properties and origins.

== Comparative linguistics ==
As Hilferding is mostly known for his works on Slovincians, the other important side of his work - research into the relations of Slavonic to Sanskrit is often overlooked. Soon after graduating the St. Petersburg University in 1853, he wrote an Essay О сродстве языка славянского с санскритским/O srodstve jazyka slavjanskogo s sanskritskim (On cognition of Slavonic language with Sanskrit). In this work, he made the first scientific and systematic comparison of the phonetic correspondences between the two languages and provided a list of several hundred cognate words. It is particularly important that being an expert in many Slavonic languages and not just Russian, and having knowledge of the Russian dialects, Hilferding did not limit this list to Russian but it embraced all the principal Slavonic languages. Although some of his etymologies have been proven incorrect, his essay stands unsurpassed even today and is unduly forgotten. These are some quotes from the Introduction to this book:

"Linguistics is yet a very young science. Therefore, although it has attained great achievements in the course of its 36-year existence, there are still considerable gaps in it. One of the most significant gaps is the Slavonic language. The science of Linguistics had its start in Germany and it owes to the German scholars its most important discoveries. It is natural that they, while keeping as the base Sanskrit - the language that has preserved most truthfully the primordial state of the Indo-European tongue, dispersed, distorted or lost in other cognate languages, mainly expounded the languages that were better known to them, namely Greek, Latin and all German dialects. Other languages attracted much less of their attention. Yet it is strange that out of all other languages Slavonic takes the last place in their works. They would rather base their conclusions on the Zend language or Lithuanian or Celtic then on the rich and flourishing language of the tribe occupying the Eastern part of Europe. This phenomenon is hard to explain: they are either unable to lean the Slavonic language (yet they could indeed learn a language which was not known to anybody with unknown writing - the Ancient Persian), or they are lost in the multitude of Slavonic dialects having equal importance for a scientist, or they do not want to touch the subject which should be developed by Slavs themselves. Whatever it was, the comparative linguistics, created in the West by German scientists, does not have the knowledge of the Slavonic language; it only knows that there is a rather rich language in the Indo-European family known as Slavonic. But what is this language? What is its relation to the cognate languages? Do not ask this from the Linguistics of our Western neighbours."

Hilferding believed that it was imperative to study the relations of Slavonic to other Indo-European languages after clearing up the relation between Slavonic and Sanskrit. He planned to make a number of essays on this subject and particularly on the relations between Lithuanian and Sanskrit. Unfortunately, this work was interrupted by his untimely death from typhus in 1872.

== Bibliography ==
- "Гильфердинг, Александр Федорович" . Brockhaus and Efron Encyclopedic Dictionary (in Russian). 1906.
- Imperial Moscow University: 1755-1917: encyclopedic dictionary. Moscow: Russian political encyclopedia (ROSSPEN). 2010. pp. 163–164. ISBN 978-5-8243-1429-8.
