= Sianowo =

- Village
- Swiónowò
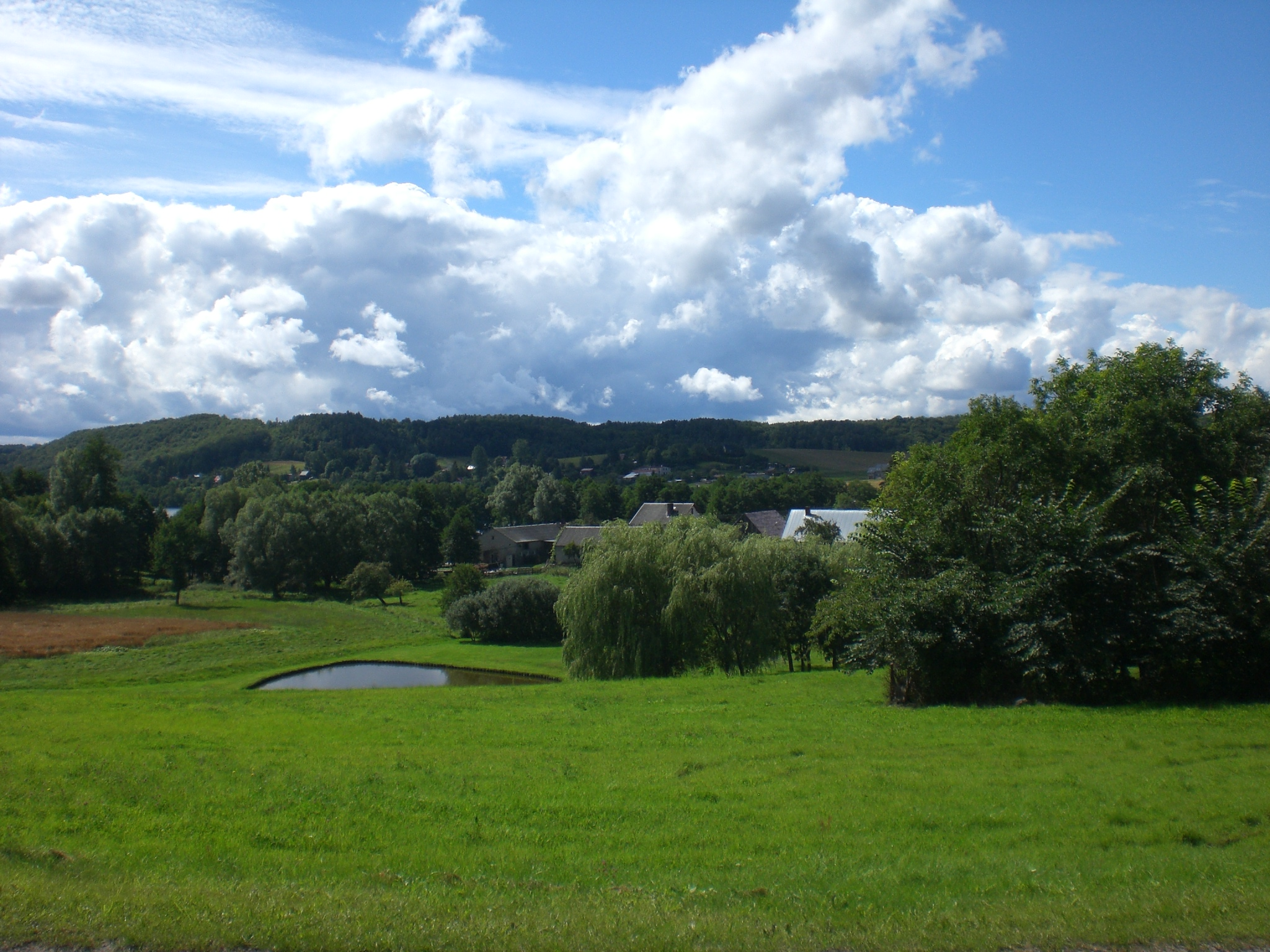

- Location within Poland
- Coordinates: 54°23′17″N 18°5′20″E
- Country: Poland
- Voivodeship: Pomeranian
- County: Kartuzy
- Gmina: Kartuzy
- Time zone: UTC+1 (CET)
  - Summer (DST): UTC+2 (CEST)
- Vehicle registration: GKA

Sianowo [ɕaˈnɔvɔ] (Kashubian: Swiónowò or Sjónowò) is a village in the administrative district of Gmina Kartuzy, within Kartuzy County, Pomeranian Voivodeship, in northern Poland. It is located on the eastern shore of Sianowskie Lake, within the ethnocultural region of Kashubia in the historic region of Pomerania.

== History ==
=== Origin ===
The Sanctuary of The Queen of the Kashubs in Sianowo church is currently the biggest in Kashubia.

The first mention of Sianowo dates to 1348. The place name probably derives from the North Germanic name Sven. In 1480, the church burned in a fire; however, The Madonna of Swionowo, a finely crafted statue, was saved. After the fire, the parish of Sianowo became a part of Strzepcz parish, although the church was later rebuilt. Around this time, the veneration of "The Mother of God" grew in popularity. Sources claim that, by the 15th century, a host of people were already making pilgrimages to Sianowo for blessings. Sianowo was a royal village of the Kingdom of Poland, administratively located in the Mirachowo County in the Pomeranian Voivodeship.

=== Nineteenth century ===
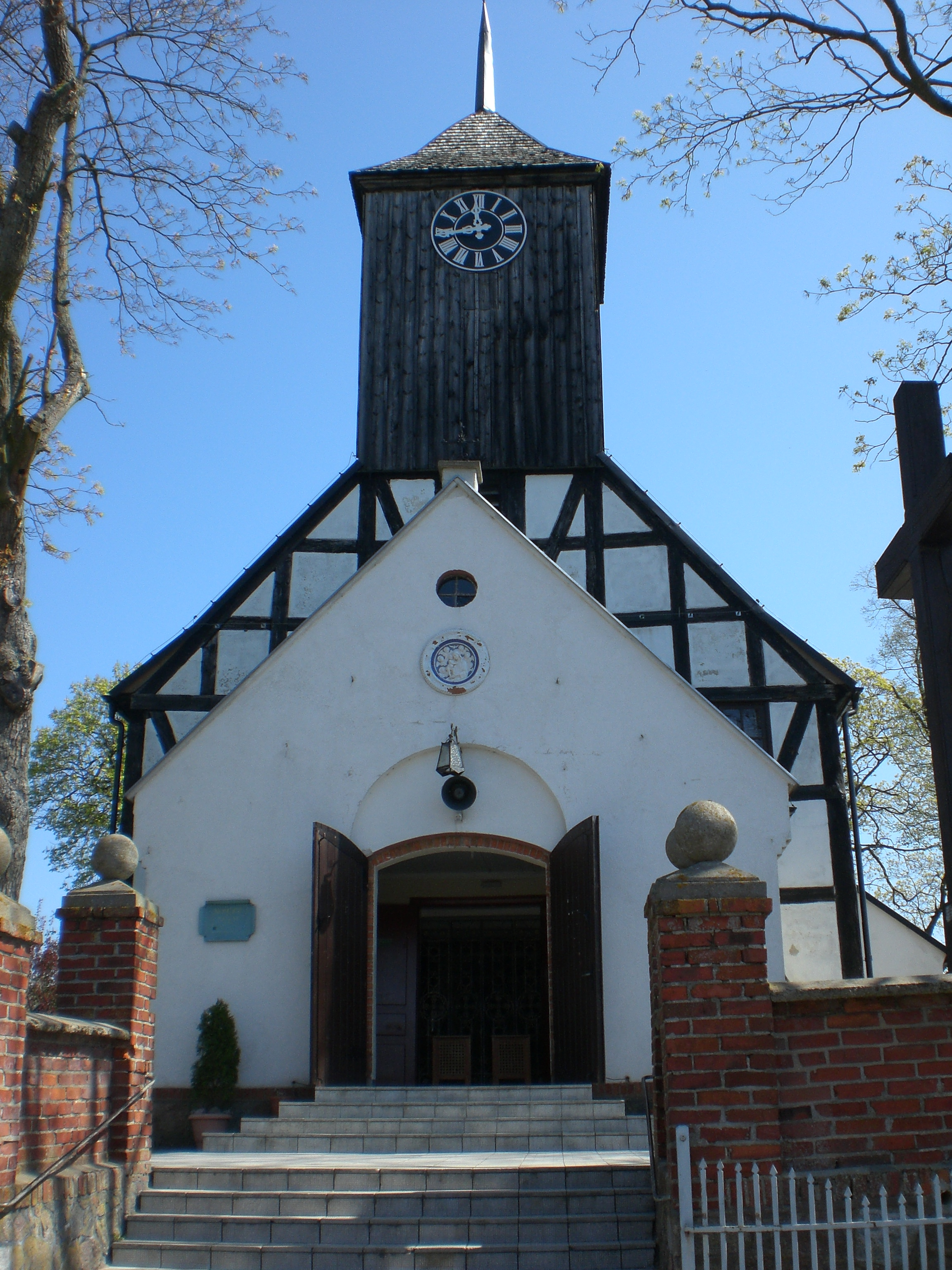
Sanctuary of The Queen of the Kashubs

In 1810, for the second time, the church was destroyed by fire. The statue was once again saved and moved to Strzepcz.

The parish priest of Strzepcz did not want to rebuild the Sianowo church. However, The Madonna was shown to a woman who prophesied that it was absolutely necessary to rebuild the church, and that doing otherwise would lead to bad luck. This testimony was given under oath in the presence of the priest. The church was then quickly rebuilt and the number of worshipers rapidly grew.

In 1864, the Sianowo parish was installed for the second time. Sources from that time state that Many lame and crippled who come are cured because of the Madonna. The maimed left their crutches and sticks in Sianowo; young people who wished to be married willingly made pilgrimages; soldiers reporting to the battlefields of World War II sought blessings. It is believed that they repeatedly owed their miraculous rescue to Her.

=== World War II ===
During the German occupation of Poland (World War II), in 1939, some inhabitants of Sianowo were among the victims of a massacre of Poles committed by the Germans in nearby Kaliska as part of the Intelligenzaktion. In 1941 and 1943, the German police and SS carried out expulsions of Poles, who were deported to the Potulice concentration camp, while their farms were handed over to German colonists as part of the Lebensraum policy.

=== Post-war period ===
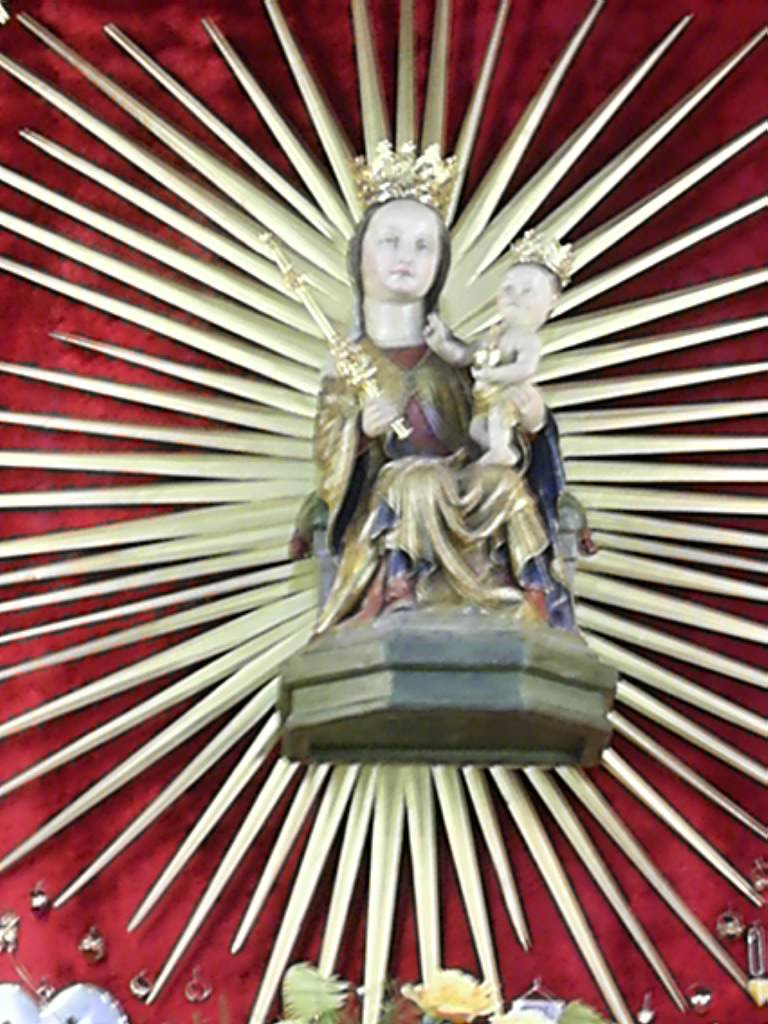
The Madonna of Sianowo, Queen of the Kashubs

Franciszek Grucza (1911–1993), was an outstanding priest, and translated the Gospels into the Kashubian language. His and many other testimonies led Chełmno Kazimierz Bishop Józef Kowalski to address a request (1965) to Pope Paul VI to crown the miraculous statue as the Queen of the Kashubes. The Pope agreed to this request and the coronation occurred on September 4, 1966. Many bishops and a great number of Kashubians assembled. From this time, veneration further grew. In 1987, Pope John Paul II christened Sianowo as an important place for Kashubian religious worship. He told:"All of you, your families and your troubles I put to the feet of Christ's Mother, hallowed in many sanctuaries of this land, and especially in Sianowo ...".

The Pilgrims' Square, where approximately 20,000 people assemble every year to celebrate the July church festival, has been restored. For the festival, about 40 companies of pilgrims arrive on foot each year. Pilgrims from Miastko cover the longest route of 120 km (75 mi). Pilgrims willingly emphasize their Kashubian roots, and several of them arrive in their traditional dresses. They carry props and banners bearing witness to their attachment to the Catholic faith and the Kashubian identity. At each church festival, a part of the liturgy is in the Kashubian language.

In 2016 Wilno church received a replica statue of Our Lady of Sianowo, Queen of Kaszebe from the Parish of Sianowo.

== See also ==
- Jan Trepczyk
- Aleksander Majkowski
