= Sławoszyno =

- Village
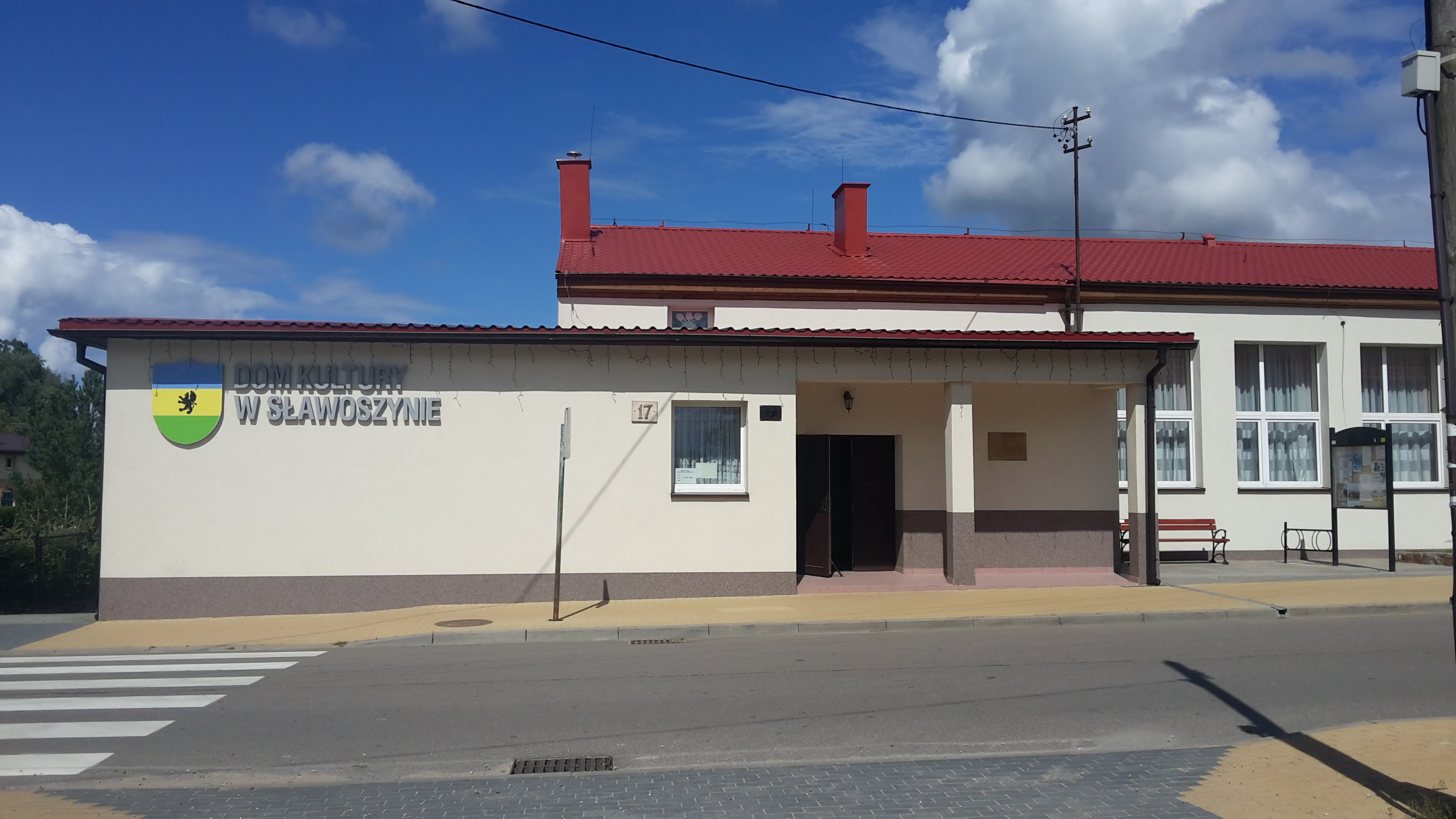
- Culture House and library (2016)

- Location within Poland
- Coordinates: 54°47′11″N 18°11′50″E
- Country: Poland
- Voivodeship: Pomeranian
- County: Puck
- Gmina: Krokowa
- Population: 652

Sławoszyno [swavɔˈʂɨnɔ] is a village in the administrative district of Gmina Krokowa, within Puck County, Pomeranian Voivodeship, in northern Poland.

For details of the history of the region, see History of Pomerania.
