= Strysza Buda =

- Village
- Location within Poland
- Coordinates: 54°23′57″N 18°2′46″E
- Country: Poland
- Voivodeship: Pomeranian
- County: Kartuzy
- Gmina: Kartuzy
- Population: 88

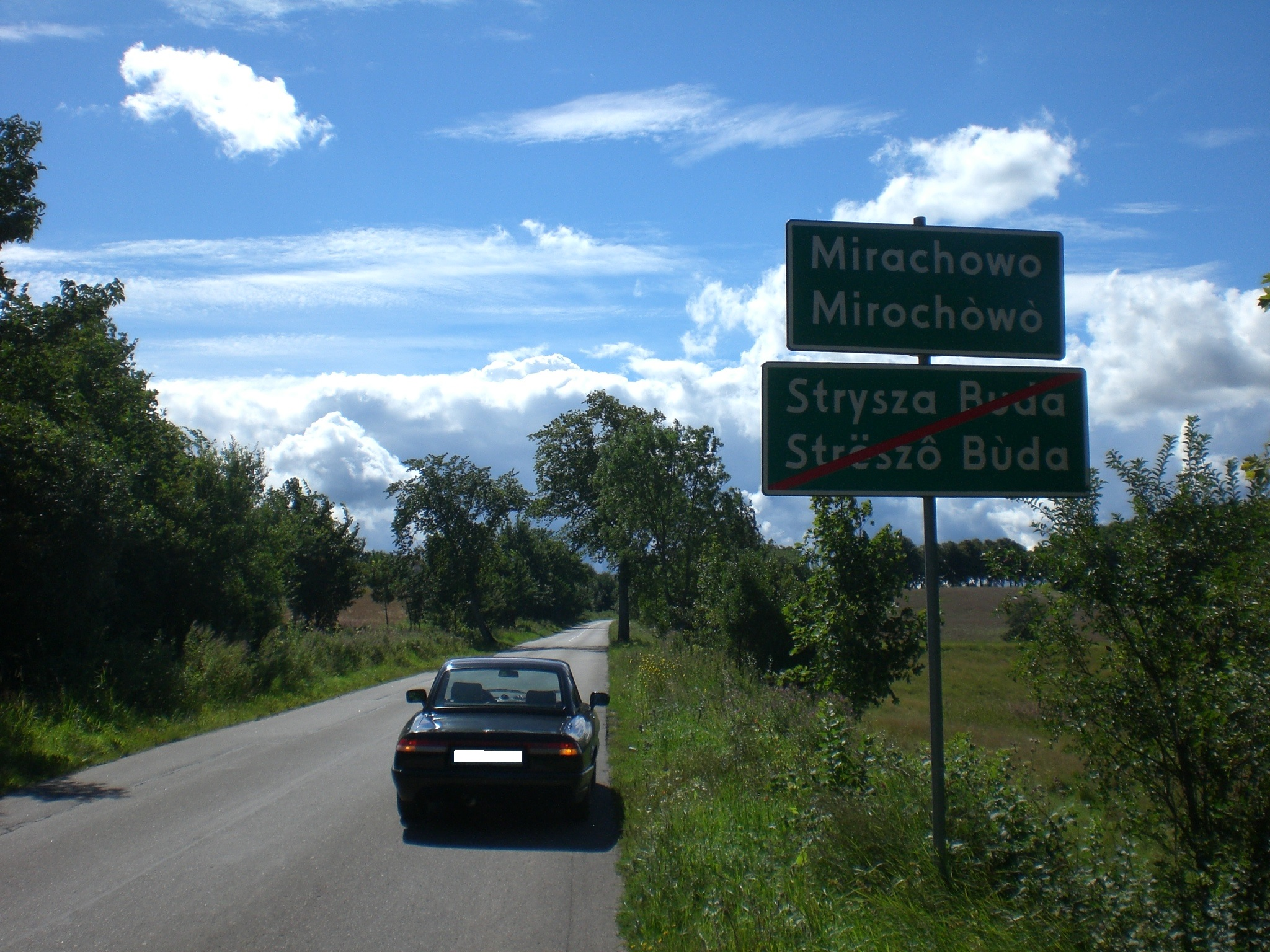
Strysza Buda in Polish and Cashubian

Strysza Buda [ˈstrɨʂa ˈbuda] (Cashubian Strëszô Bùda [ˈstrəʃɞ ˈbwʉdä]) is a village in the administrative district of Gmina Kartuzy, within Kartuzy County, Pomeranian Voivodeship, in northern Poland.

For details of the history of the region, see History of Pomerania.
