= Kashubian Landscape Park =

Protected area in Poland

Coordinates: 54°19′54″N 18°03′01″E

- Kaszubski Park Krajobrazowy; Kaszëbsczi Park Krajòbrazny
- IUCN category V (protected landscape/seascape)
- Interactive map of Kashubian Landscape Park
- Location: Pomeranian Voivodeship
- Area: 332.02 km^{2} (128.19 sq mi)
- Established: 1983

Kashubian Landscape Park (Polish: Kaszubski Park Krajobrazowy, Kashubian: Kaszëbsczi Park Krajòbrazny) is a Landscape Park, a Polish protected area classification, in northern Poland. It represents the natural landscape of and is named after the historic Kashubian culture that existed in this region.

== Geography ==
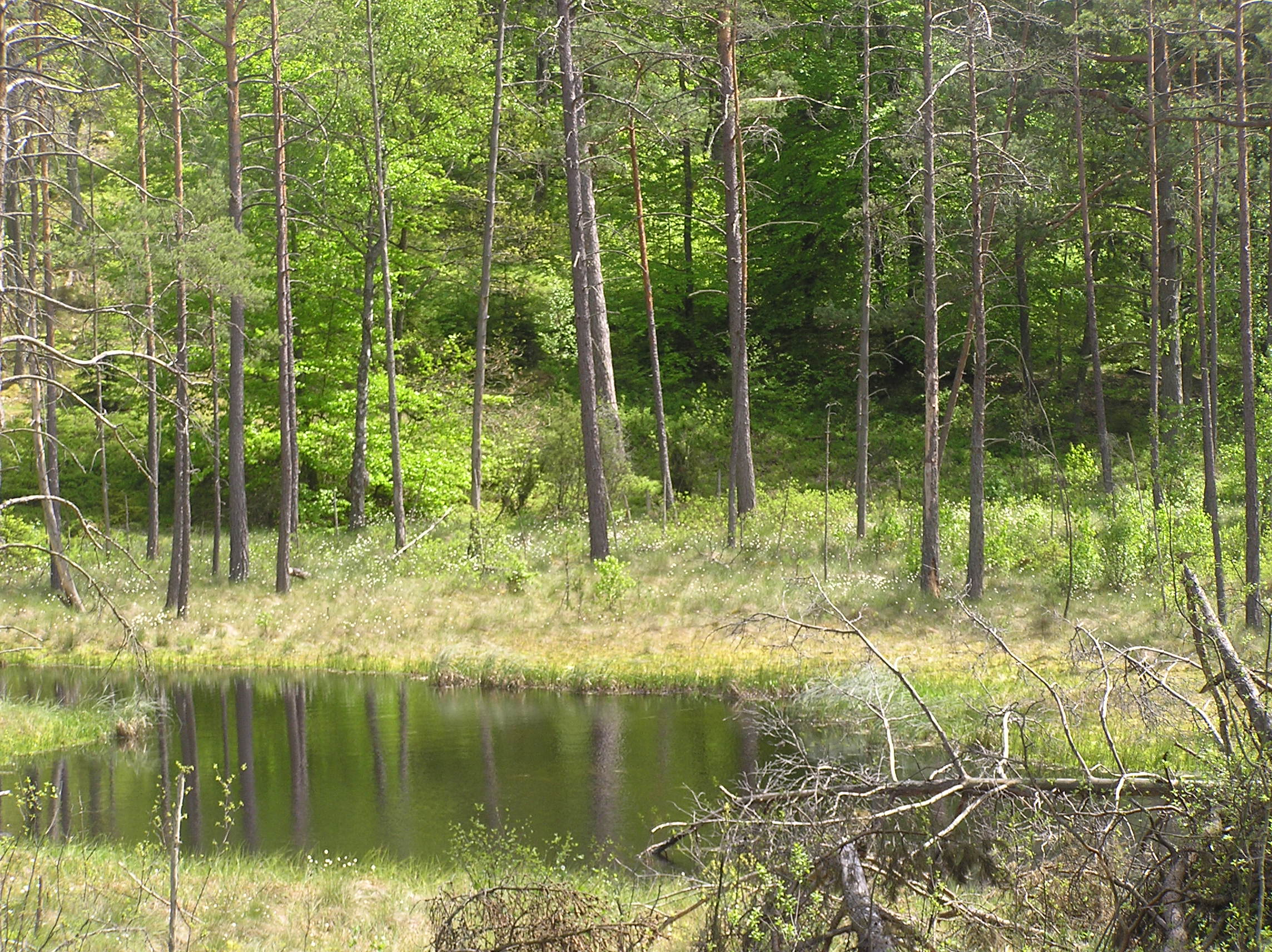

The Kashubian Landscape Park covers an area of 332.02 square kilometres (128.19 sq mi), and was established in 1983. The Park lies within Pomeranian Voivodeship: in Kartuzy County (Gmina Kartuzy, Gmina Chmielno, Gmina Sierakowice, Gmina Somonino), Wejherowo County (Gmina Linia), and Kościerzyna County (Gmina Kościerzyna, Gmina Nowa Karczma).

== Nature reserves ==
Within the Kashubian Landscape Park are 12 distinct nature reserves.

== Literature ==
- PRZEWOŹNIAK, M. (Red.): Materiały do monografii przyrodniczej regionu gdańskiego, T. 2, Kaszubski Park Krajobrazowy : walory - zagrożenia - ochrona : praca zbiorowa. Gdańsk : "Marpress", 2000 ISBN 83-87291-87-0.

== See also ==
- Kashubians
- List of Landscape Parks of Poland
- Protected areas of Poland
