= Jerzy Treder =

Polish philologist and linguist (1942–2015)

- Jerzi Tréder
- Born: April 14, 1942; Weißfluß, Rahmel, Reichsgau Danzig-West Prussia, Nazi Germany
- Died: April 2, 2015 (aged 72); Wejherowo, Pomeranian Voivodeship, Poland
- Spouse: Gertruda née Kosirog
- Children: 2
- Parents: Władysław (father); Anastazja née Młyńska (mother)

Academic background
- Education: University of Gdańsk
- Thesis: Toponimia byłego powiatu puckiego (1973)
- Doctoral advisor: Hubert Górnowicz

Academic work
- Discipline: Humanities
- Sub-discipline: Dialectology
- Institutions: University of Gdańsk

Jerzy Treder (14 April 1942 – 2 April 2015) was a Polish philologist and linguist, focusing on Kashubian studies, among other interests. He was born in Weißfluß, Rahmel (now Biała Rzeka, Rumia), in the Reichsgau Danzig-West Prussia of Nazi Germany. In 1987–1990 he was deputy director of the Institute of Polish Philology in Gdańsk University.

== Biography ==
In 1973 he earned a degree of Doctor in Humanities, with the thesis Toponimia byłego powiatu puckiego (transl. Toponymy of the Former Puck Powiat). In 1987 he habilitated in linguistics for Ze studiów nad frazeologią kaszubską (na tle porównawczym). He received the title of professor in 1994 and the position of professor ordinarius in 2002.

Treder died at the age of 72 on April 2, 2015. His funeral took place in Reda.

== Books ==
- 70 lat „Poradnika Językowego”. Zawartość pisma w latach 1901-1970 [Z przedmową W. Doroszewskiego], PWN, Warszawa 1972
- Toponimia byłego powiatu puckiego, Gdańsk 1977
- Słownik nazw terenowych byłego powiatu puckiego, Zesz. Nauk. WH UG. Prace językoznawcze nr 5, Gdańsk 1977 [printed 1978]
- Pochodzenie Pomorzan oraz choronimów i etnonimów z obszaru Pomorza Gdańskiego, Gdańsk 1982
- Ze studiów nad frazeologią kaszubską (na tle porównawczym), UG, Gdańsk 1986
- Frazeologia kaszubska a wierzenia i zwyczaje (na tle porównawczym), Muzeum Piśmiennictwa i Muzyki Kaszubsko-Pomorskiej. Towarzystwo *Przyjaciół Ziemi Wejherowskiej, Wejherowo 1989
- Toponimia powiatu wejherowskiego, Pomorskie Monografie Toponomastyczne nr 14, GTN, Gdańsk 1997
- Nazwy ptaków we frazeologii i inne studia z frazeologii i paremiologii polskiej, Wyd. UG, Gdańsk 2005
- Historia kaszubszczyzny literackiej. Studia, Wyd. UG, Gdańsk 2005
- Spòdlowô wiédza ò kaszëbiznie, Oficyna Czec, Gdańsk 2009

=== Co-authored ===
- J. Treder, E. Breza, Zasady pisowni kaszubskiej, Gdańsk 1976, ss. 52; wyd. 2. przejrzane i poszerzone. Na podstawie postanowień Komisji do Spraw Pisowni Kaszubskiej w składzie [...] oprac. E. Breza i J. Treder, Wyd. ZG ZK-P, Gdańsk 1975; wyd. 2. przejrzane i poszerzone, Gdańsk 1984, ss. 72.
- E. Breza, J. Treder, Gramatyka kaszubska. Zarys popularny, Gdańsk 1981, ss. 185.
- J. Borzyszkowski, J. Mordawski, J. Treder, Historia, geografia, język i piśmiennictwo Kaszubów. Historia, geògrafia, jãzëk i pismienizna Kaszëbów, Wyd. M. Rożak, Gdańsk 1999, ss. 190 + 2 nlb.
- J. Drwal, W. Odyniec, J. Treder, Góra – wieś i parafia. Środowisko, dzieje, język, Urząd Gminy Wejherowo, Wejherowo 1998, ss. 136 + 1 nlb.
- (collection) Język kaszubski. Poradnik encyklopedyczny, ed. J. Tredera, UG i Oficyna Czec, Gdańsk 2002.
- (collection) Język kaszubski. Poradnik encyklopedyczny. ed. J. Treder, Rev. 2. corrected and expanded UG, Oficyna Czec, Gdańsk 2006.
- Kaszubi, wierzenia i twórczość: ze Słownika Sychty, Oficyna Czec, 2000 (rework of Bernard Sychta's Dictionary of Kashubian Dialects)
- Wstãpné słowò, w: Kaszëbsczé dzeje ë dzysészé żëcé. Dokôzë kaszëbsczi prozë. Zwësk Òglowòpòlsczégò Kònkùrsu prozatorsczégò miona Jana Drzéżdżóna z lat 2000–2003. Ùszëkòwôł... J. Tréder, Wejrowò 2004 ISBN 8391624498.
- Kashubian to Polish. Language Contacts
