= Kashubians =

West Slavic ethnic group

Kaszëbi
- Flag and coat of arms of Kashubia

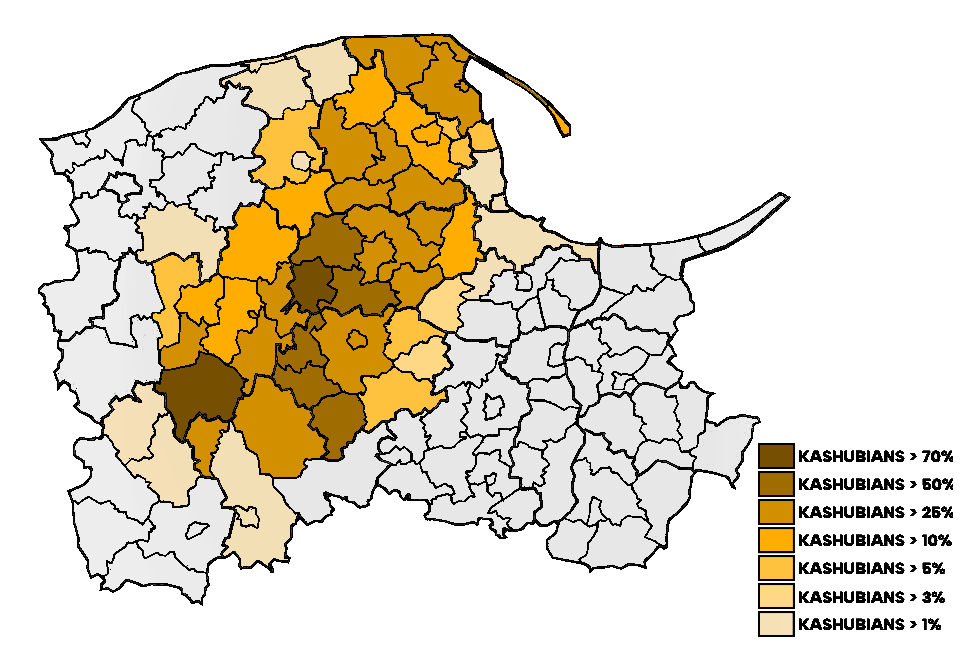
- Population of Kashubians in Pomeranian Voivodeship, 2021

Total population
- in Poland between 500,000 (2002) and 567,000 (2005) of which 179,685 (2021) claim as ethnic-national identity

Regions with significant populations
- Poland; Germany (diaspora); United States (diaspora); Canada (diaspora)

Languages
- Kashubian, Polish (New mixed dialects, Kociewie dialect, Krajna dialect, Bory Tucholskie dialect), historically East Pomeranian & Low Prussian

Religion
- Roman Catholicism, Protestantism

Related ethnic groups
- Other West Slavs; Especially other Lechites

The Kashubians (Kashubian: Kaszëbi; Polish: Kaszubi; German: Kaschuben), also known as Cassubians or Kashubs, are a West Slavic ethnic group native to the historical region of Pomerania, including its eastern part called Pomerelia, in north-central Poland. Their settlement area is referred to as Kashubia. They speak the Kashubian language, which is classified as a separate language closely related to Polish.

The Kashubs are closely related to the Poles and sometimes classified as their subgroup. Moreover, the vast majority of Kashubians declare themselves as Poles and many of them have a Polish-Kashubian identity. The Kashubs are grouped with the Slovincians as Pomeranians. Similarly, the Slovincian (now extinct) and Kashubian languages are grouped as Pomeranian languages, with Slovincian (also known as Łeba Kashubian) either a distinct language closely related to Kashubian, or a Kashubian dialect.

== Modern Kashubia ==
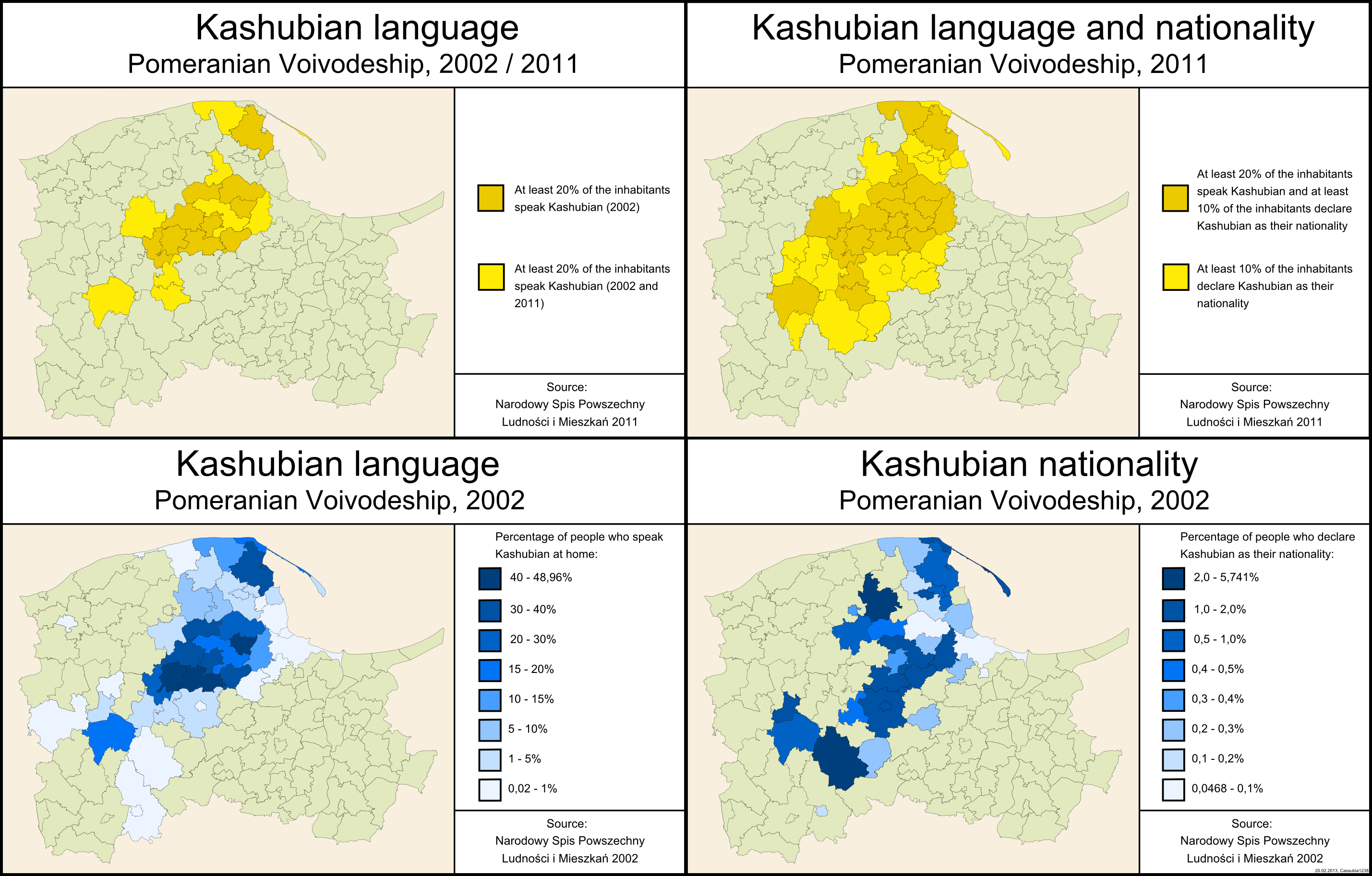
Kashubian language and nationality.

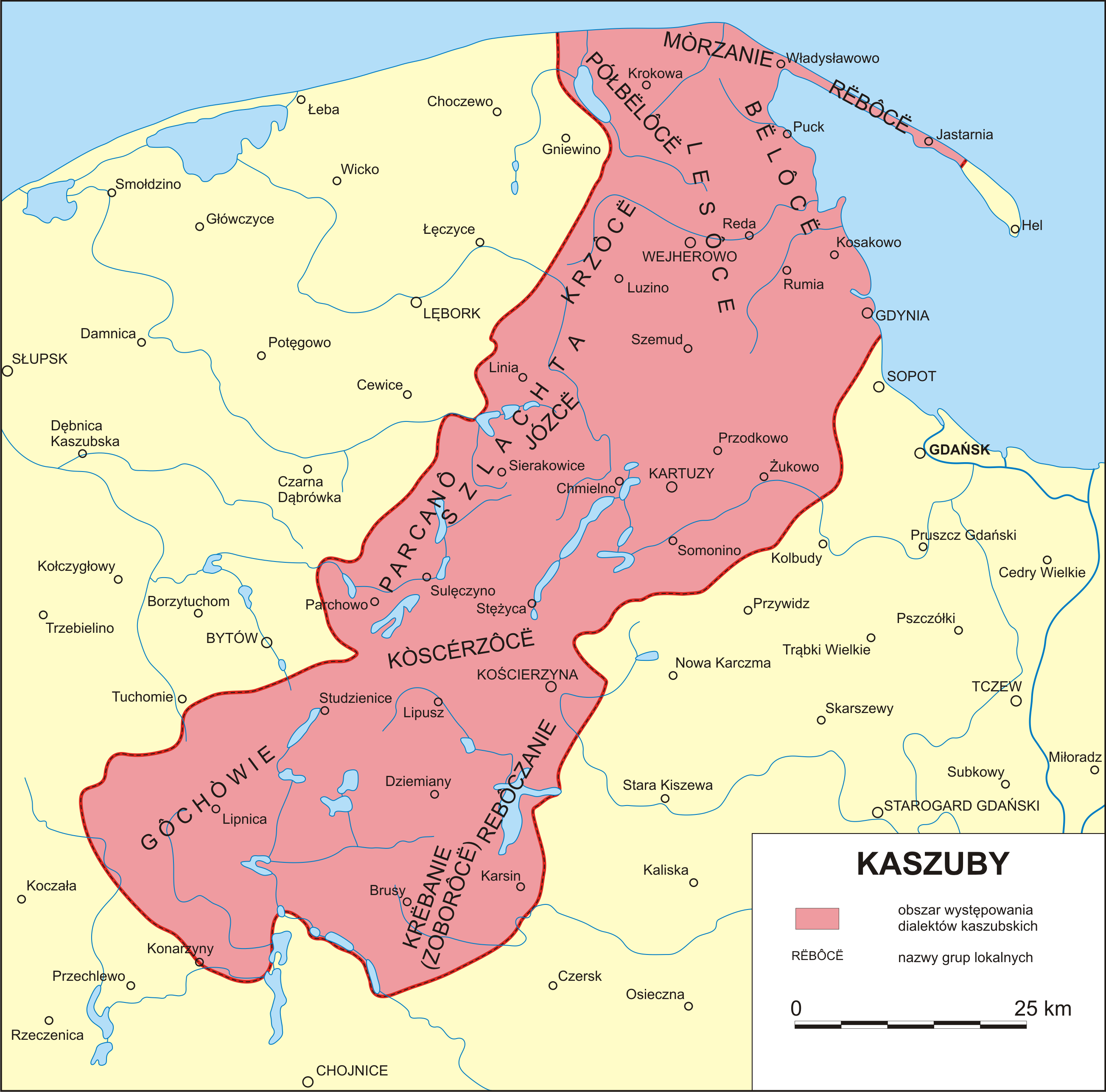
Kashubia with Kashubian local names on ethnic territory in the twentieth century.

Among larger cities, Gdynia (Gdiniô) contains the largest proportion of people declaring Kashubian origin. However, the biggest city of the Kashubia region is Gdańsk (Gduńsk), the capital of the Pomeranian Voivodeship. Between 80.3% and 93.9% of the people in towns such as Linia, Sierakowice, Szemud, Kartuzy, Chmielno, Żukowo, etc. are of Kashubian descent.

The traditional occupations of the Kashubs have been agriculture and fishing. These have been joined by the service and hospitality industries, as well as agrotourism. The main organization that maintains the Kashubian identity is the Kashubian-Pomeranian Association. The recently formed "Odroda" is also dedicated to the renewal of Kashubian culture.

The traditional capital has been disputed for a long time and includes Kartuzy (Kartuzë), Kościerzyna (Kòscérzëna) or Puck (Pùck) among the seven contenders. The biggest cities claiming to be the capital are: Gdańsk (Gduńsk), Wejherowo (Wejrowò), and Bytów (Bëtowò).

=== Population ===
The total number of Kashubians (Pomeranians) varies depending on one's definition. A common estimate is that over 500,000 people in Poland are of the Kashubian ethnicity, the estimates range from ca. 500,000 to ca. 567,000. In the Polish census of 2002, only 5,062 people declared Kashubian national identity, although 52,655 declared Kashubian as their everyday language. Most Kashubs declare Polish national identity and Kashubian ethnicity, and are considered both Polish and Kashubian. On the 2002 census there was no option to declare one national identity and a different ethnicity, or more than one ethnicity. On the 2011 census, the number of persons declaring "Kashubian" as their only ethnicity was 16,000, and 233,000 including those who declared Kashubian as first or second ethnicity (together with Polish). In that census, over 108,000 people declared everyday use of Kashubian language. The number of people who can speak at least some Kashubian is higher, around 366,000.

People with Kashubian ancestry and at least some understanding of Kashubian in Pomerelia (2005)
County / City	Kashubian descent	%	Can speak at least some Kashubian	%	Total population
Puck	56,358	80.2	163,707	53.3	69,900
Wejherowo	113,097	66.1	163,707	53.3	171,100
Kościerzyna	49,116	74.5	163,707	53.3	65,900
Kartuzy	94,136	93.8	83,592	83.3	100,300
Bytów	37,767	49.2	26,544	34.6	76,700
Chojnice	23,926	26.3	37,954	18.8	91,000
Lębork	19,594	29.7	37,954	18.8	65,800
Gdańsk	13,742	30.6	37,954	18.8	45,000
Gdynia City	81,090	31.8	10,223	4.0	255,000
Gdańsk City	47,163	10.3	31,211	6.2	457,900
Sopot City	5,795	13.7	31,211	6.2	42,300
Słupsk	7,945	8.4	8,889	4.5	94,100
Słupsk City	9,504	9.3	8,889	4.5	102,200
Człuchów	7,814	13.3	3,713	6.3	58,800
Total	567,000	33.4	366,000	21.6	1,696,000

As of 1890, linguist Stefan Ramułt estimated the number of Kashubs (including Slovincians) in Pomerelia as 174,831. He also estimated that at that time there were over 90,000 Kashubs in the United States, around 25,000 in Canada,15,000 in Brazil and 25,000 elsewhere in the world. In total 330,000.

In the census of 2021 in total 179,685 people in Poland claimed Kashubian as their ethnic-national identity. Of them only 12,846 claimed it without accompanying Polish identity.

== History ==
Kashubians are a Western Slavic people living on the shores of the Baltic Sea. Kashubians have their own unique language, history, culture and traditions.

=== Historical population ===
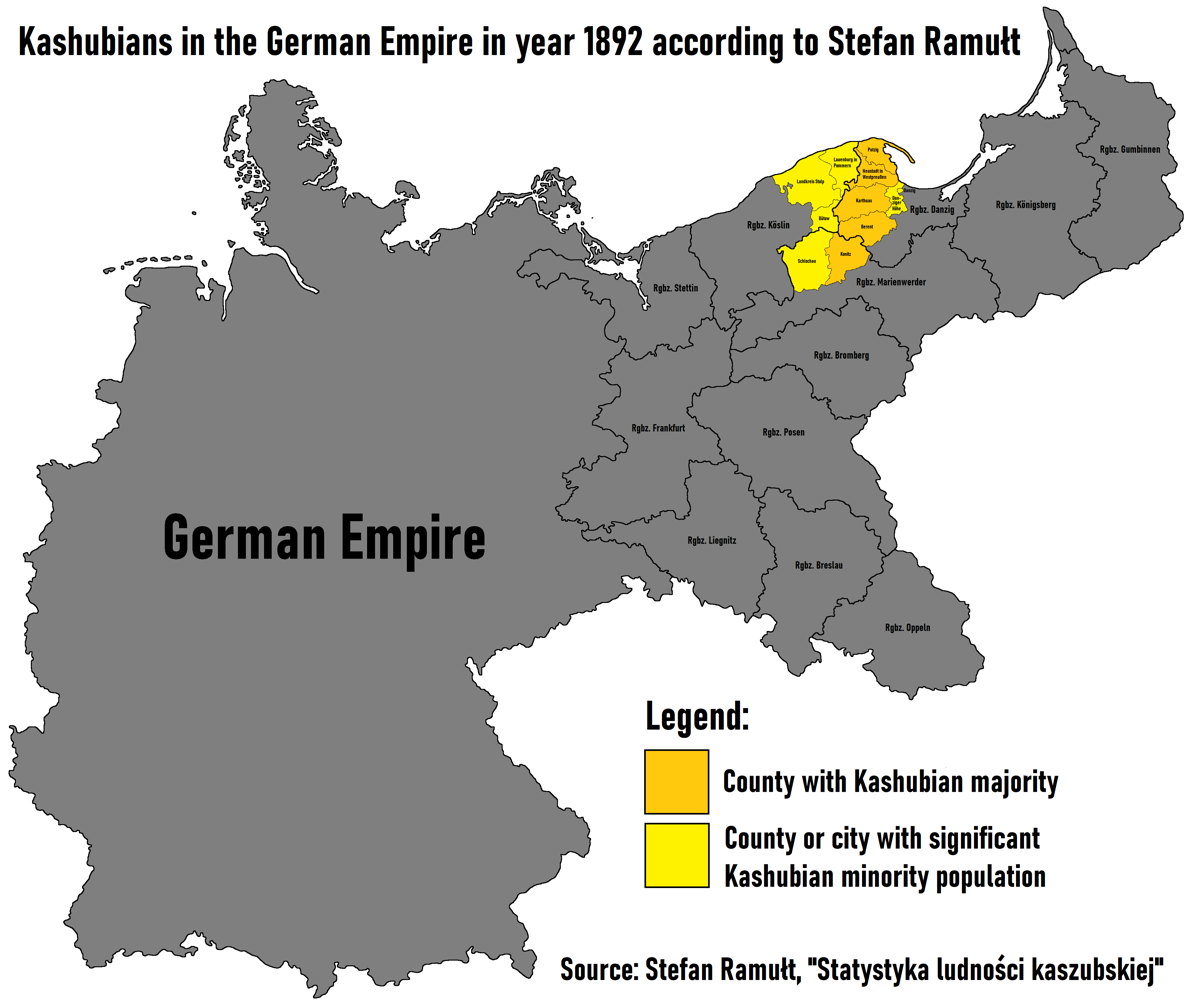
Kashubian population in year 1892

Until the end of the 12th century, the vast majority of inhabitants of Pomerania (Hither, Farther and Eastern) were Slavic-speakers, but the province was quite sparsely populated, with large areas covered by forests and waste lands. During the 13th century, the German Ostsiedlung began in this region. Slavic dukes of Pomerania such as Barnim I (1220–1278) – despite calling themselves dux Slavorum et Cassubie – contributed a lot to the change of ethnic structure by promoting German immigration and granting land to German nobles, monks and clergy. The Slavic ruling dynasty itself started intermarrying with German princesses and became culturally Germanized over time. Wendish commoners became alienated in their own land, their culture replaced by that of newcomers. All of this led to Germanization of most of Slavic Pomeranians and the gradual death of their Slavic language, with the general direction of assimilation and language shift from west to east. Johannes Bugenhagen wrote that at the beginning of the 16th century the German-Slavic language border was near Koszalin. During the 17th century, the border between areas with mostly German-speaking and mostly Slavic-speaking populations ran more or less along the present-day border between West Pomeranian and Pomeranian Voivodeships.

In year 1612, cartographer Eilhard Lubinus – while working on his map of Pomerania – travelled from the direction of Pollnow towards Treblin on his way to Gdańsk. While staying in the manor house of Stanislaus Stenzel von Puttkamer in Treblin, he noted in his diary: "we have entered Slavic-inhabited lands, which has surprised us a lot." Later, while returning from Gdańsk to Stettin, Lubinus slept over in Wielka Wieś near Stolp, and noted: "in the whole village, we cannot find even one German-speaker" (which caused communication problems). Lubinus also travelled from Chocimino through Świerzno to Trzebielino, he entered Slavic-inhabited land. During another trip, near Wierzchocino, he was not able to find even one German-speaking person.

Over a century later, in 1772–1778, the area was visited by Johann Bernoulli. He noted that villages owned by Otto Christoph von Podewils – such as Dochow, Zipkow and Warbelin – were inhabited entirely by Slavic-speakers. He also noted that local priests and nobles were making great efforts to weed out Slavic language and turn their subjects into Germans. Brüggemann in 1779 wrote that the area to the east of Lupow river was inhabited by "pure-blood Wends", while to the west of this river some rural areas were inhabited by already half-Germanised "Wendischdeutsche".

Perhaps the earliest census figures on ethnic or national structure of West Prussia and Farther Pomerania are from 1817 to 1823.

Ethnic structure (Nationalverschiedenheit) of West Prussia in 1817–1819
Ethnic group	Population (number)	Population (percent)
Poles (Polen), incl. Kashubs (number not specified)	327,300	52%
Germans (Deutsche), incl. Mennonites (Mennoniten)	277,350 + 12,650 Mennonites	44% + 2% (Mennonites)
Jews (Juden)	12,700	2%
Total	630,077	100%

Ethnic structure (Nationalverschiedenheit) of the Province of Pomerania in 1817–1819
Ethnic group	Population (number)	Population (percent)
Germans (Deutsche)	633,000	90.3%
Slavic Wends and Kashubians (Wenden und Kassuben)	65,000	9.3%
Jews (Juden)	2,976	0.4%
Total	700,766	100%

Karl Andree, Polen: in geographischer, geschichtlicher und culturhistorischer Hinsicht (Leipzig 1831), gives the total population of West Prussia as 700,000 – including 50% Poles (350,000), 47% Germans (330,000) and 3% Jews (20,000). Kashubians are included with Poles, while Mennonites with Germans.

Modern estimates of Kashubian population in West Prussia in the early 19th century, by county, are given by Leszek Belzyt and Jan Mordawski:

Kashubians in counties of Eastern Kashubia in 1831 according to modern scholars:
County (Kreis)	Total population	Kashubians and Poles	Percent
Wejherowo-Puck (Weyersfrey-Putzig)	35,250	28,905	82.0%
Kartuzy (Karthaus)	29,144	24,772	85.0%
Kościerzyna (Berent)	23,120	16,646	72.0%
Chojnice (Konitz) without Tuchola	23,000	15,525	67.5%
Gdańsk Highlands (Danziger Höhe)	27,000	9,450	35.0%
Człuchów (Schlochau)	32,611	8,100	25.0%
Total in Eastern Kashubia:	170,125	103,400	60.8%

According to Georg Hassel, there were 65,000 Slavic-speakers in the whole Provinz Pommern in 1817–1819. Modern estimates for just eastern parts of Pommern (Western Kashubia) in early 1800s range between 40,000 (Leszek Belzyt) and 25,000 (Jan Mordawski, Zygmunt Szultka). The number declined to between 35,000 and 23,000 (Zygmunt Szultka, Leszek Belzyt) in years 1827–1831. In 1850-1860s there were an estimated 23,000 to 17,000 Slavic-speakers left in Pommern, down to 15,000 in 1892 according to Stefan Ramułt. The number was declining due to Germanisation. The bulk of Slavic population in 19th century Pommern was concentrated in its easternmost counties: especially Bytów (Bütow), Lębork (Lauenburg) and Słupsk (Stolp). According to Zygmunt Szultka at the beginning of the 19th century in Provinz Pommern Kashubians were still around 55% of the total population (14,200 people) in county Lauenburg-Bütow (Lębork-Bytów) and over 25% of the total population (10,450 people) in county Stolp (Słupsk).

=== Reichstag elections (1867–1912) ===
In all constituencies with significant Catholic Kashubian population (Neustadt in Westpr.-Putzig-Karthaus; Berent-Preußisch Stargard-Dirschau; and Konitz-Tuchel), all Reichstag elections in 1867–1912 were won by the Polish Party (Polish Party, later Polenpartei).

== Origin ==
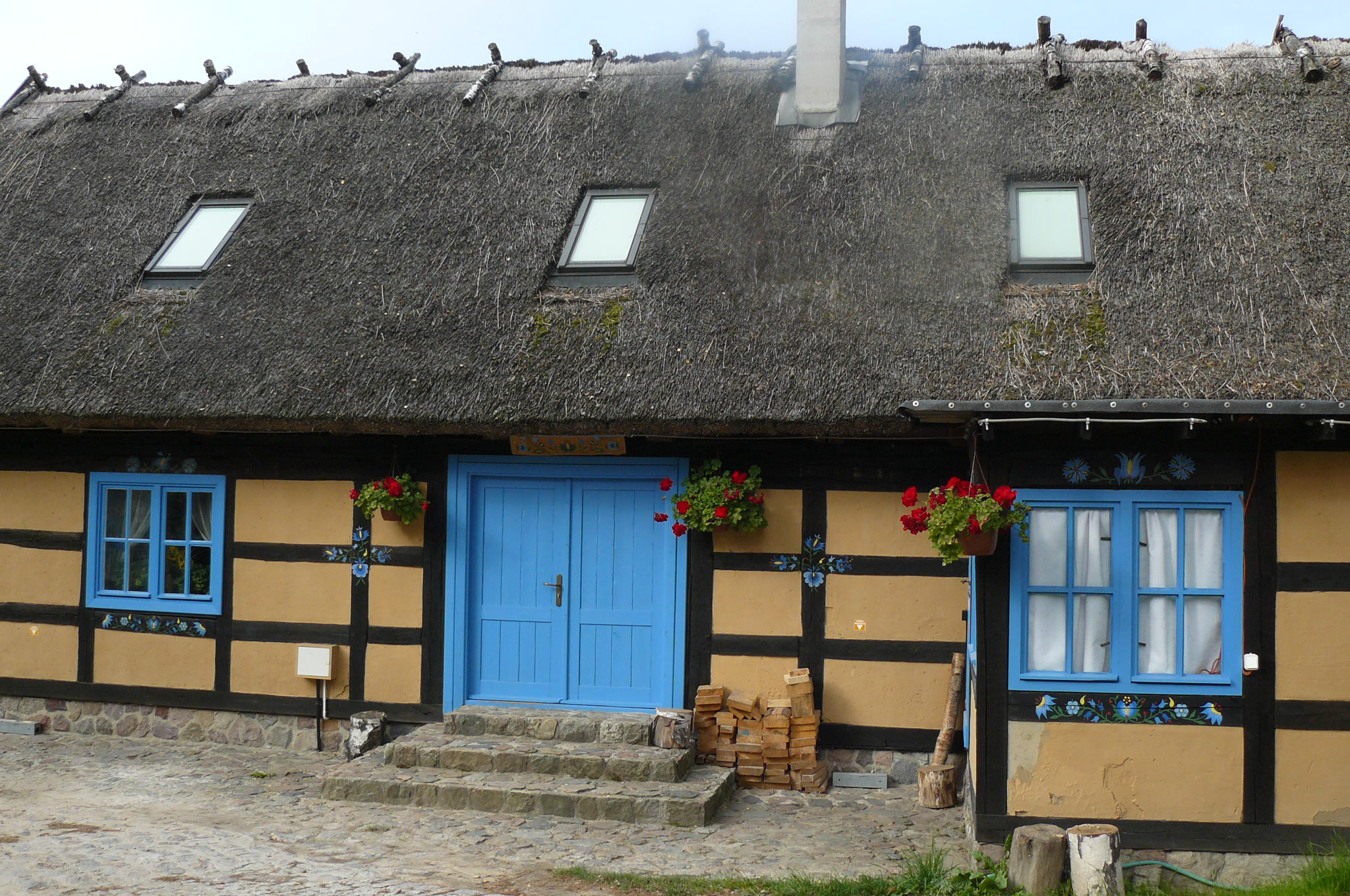
A timber framed Kashubian cottage in Szymbark

Kashubs descend from the Slavic Pomeranian tribes, who had settled between the Oder and Vistula Rivers after the Migration Period, and were at various times Polish and Danish vassals. While most Slavic Pomeranians were assimilated during the medieval German settlement of Pomerania (Ostsiedlung), especially in Eastern Pomerania (Pomerelia) some kept and developed their customs and became known as Kashubians.

The tenth century far-traveled Arab writer Al-Masudi – who had great interest in non-Muslim peoples, including the various Slavs of Eastern Europe – mentions a people which he calls Kuhsabin, who were probably Kashubians. The oldest known unambiguous mention of "Kashubia" dates from 19 March 1238 – Pope Gregory IX wrote about Bogislaw I as dux Cassubie – the Duke of Kashubia. The old one dates from the 13th century (a seal of Barnim I from the House of Pomerania, Duke of Pomerania-Stettin). The Dukes of Pomerania hence used "Duke of (the) Kashubia(ns)" in their titles, passing it to the Swedish Crown who succeeded in Swedish Pomerania when the House of Pomerania became extinct.

=== Administrative history of Kashubia ===
The westernmost (Slovincian) parts of Kashubia, located in the medieval Lands of Schlawe and Stolp and Lauenburg and Bütow Land, were integrated into the Duchy of Pomerania in 1317 and 1455, respectively, and remained with its successors (Brandenburgian Pomerania and Prussian Pomerania) until 1945, when the area became Polish. The bulk of Kashubia since the 12th century was within the medieval Pomerelian duchies, since 1308 in the Monastic state of the Teutonic Knights, since 1466 within Royal Prussia, an autonomous territory of the Polish Crown, since 1772 within West Prussia, a Prussian province, since 1920 within the Polish Corridor of the Second Polish Republic, since 1939 within the Reichsgau Danzig-West Prussia of Nazi Germany, and since 1945 within the People's Republic of Poland, and after within the Third Polish Republic.

=== Linguistic and cultural influences ===
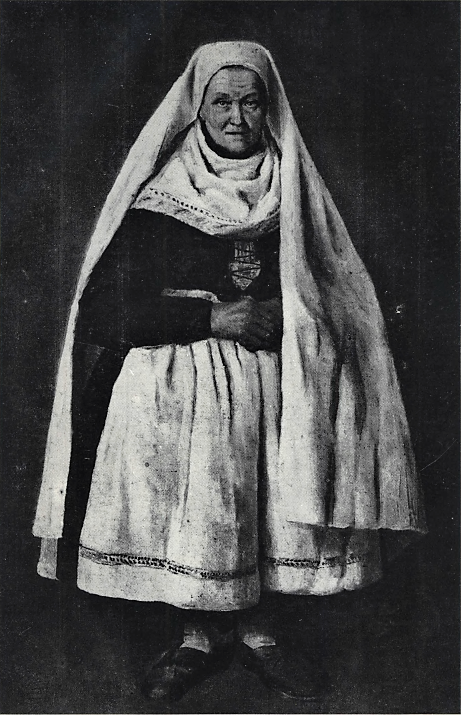
An elderly woman in festive costume from the village of Żelazo

German Ostsiedlung in Kashubia was initiated by the Pomeranian dukes and focused on the towns, whereas much of the countryside remained Kashubian. An exception was the German settled Vistula delta (Vistula Germans), the coastal regions, and the Vistula valley. Following the centuries of interaction between local German and Kashubian population, Aleksander Hilferding (1862) and Alfons Parczewski (1896) confirmed a progressive language shift in the Kashubian population from their Slavonic vernacular to the local West-Germanic dialect (Low German Ostpommersch, Low German Low Prussian, or High German).

On the other hand, Pomerelia since the Middle Ages was assigned to the Kuyavian Diocese of Leslau and thus retained Polish as the church language. Only the Slovincians in 1534 adopted Lutheranism after the Protestant Reformation had reached the Duchy of Pomerania, while the Kashubes in Pomerelia remained Roman Catholic. The Prussian parliament (Landtag) in Königsberg changed the official church language from Polish to German in 1843 but this decision was soon repealed.

In the 19th century the Kashubian activist Florian Ceynowa undertook efforts to identify the Kashubian language, and its culture and traditions. Although his efforts did not appeal to locals at the time, Kaszubian activists in the present day have claimed that Ceynowa awakened Kashubian self-identity, thereby opposing both Germanisation and Prussian authority, and Polish nobility and clergy. He believed in a separate Kashubian identity and strove for a Russian-led pan-Slavic federacy, He considered Poles "born brothers". Ceynowa was a radical who attempted to take the Prussian garrison in Preussisch Stargard (Starogard Gdański) during 1846 (see Greater Poland uprising), but the operation failed when his 100 combatants, armed only with scythes, decided to abandon the site before the attack was carried out. Although some later Kashubian activists tried to push for a separate identity, they further based their ideas on a misrepresented reading of the journalist and activist Hieronim Derdowski: "There is no Cassubia without Polonia, and no Poland without Cassubia" (Nie ma Kaszeb bez Polonii a bez Kaszeb Polsci"). Further stanzas of Derdowski's tribute also point to the fact that Kaszubs were Poles and could not survive without. The Society of Young Kashubians (Towarzystwo Młodokaszubskie) has decided to follow in this way, and while they sought to create a strong Kashubian identity, at the same time they regarded the Kashubians as "One branch, of many, of the great Polish nation".

The leader of the movement was Aleksander Majkowski, a doctor educated in Chełmno with the Society of Educational Help in Chełmno. In 1912 he founded the Society of Young Kashubians and started the newspaper Gryf. Kashubs voted for Polish lists in elections, which strengthened the representation of Poles in the Pomerania region. Between 1855 and 1900, about 100,000 Kashubs emigrated to the United States, Canada, Brazil, New Zealand, and Australia in the so-called Kashubian diaspora, largely for economic reasons. In 1899 the scholar Stefan Ramult named Winona, Minnesota the "Kashubian Capital of America" on account of the Kashubian community's size within the city and its activity. Due to their Catholic faith, the Kashubians became subject to Prussia's Kulturkampf between 1871 and 1878. The Kashubians faced Germanification efforts, including those by evangelical Lutheran clergy. These efforts were successful in Lauenburg (Lębork) and Leba (Łeba), where the local population used the Gothic alphabet. While resenting the disrespect shown by some Prussian officials and Junkers, Kashubians lived in peaceful coexistence with the local German population until World War II, although during the interbellum, the Kashubian ties to Poland were either overemphasized or neglected by Polish and German authors, respectively, in arguments regarding the Polish Corridor.

During the Second World War, Kashubs were considered by the Nazis as being either of "German stock" or "extraction", or "inclined toward Germanness" and "capable of Germanisation", and thus classified third category of Deutsche Volksliste (German ethnic classification list) if ties to the Polish nation could be dissolved. However, Kashubians who were suspected to support the Polish cause, particularly those with higher education, were arrested and executed, the main place of executions being Piaśnica (Gross Plassnitz), where 12,000 were executed. The German administrator of the area Albert Forster considered Kashubians of "low value" and did not support any attempts to create Kashubian nationality. Some Kashubians organized anti-Nazi resistance groups, Gryf Kaszubski (later Gryf Pomorski), and the exiled Zwiazek Pomorski in Great Britain.

When integrated into Poland, those envisioning Kashubian autonomy faced a Communist regime striving for ethnic homogeneity and presenting Kashubian culture as merely folklore. Kashubians were sent to Silesian mines, where they met Silesians facing similar problems. Lech Bądkowski from the Kashubian opposition became the first spokesperson of Solidarność.

As a result of political mistrust and coercion to declare Polish identity many Kashubians turned away from Poland and chose opting for Germany.

== Language ==
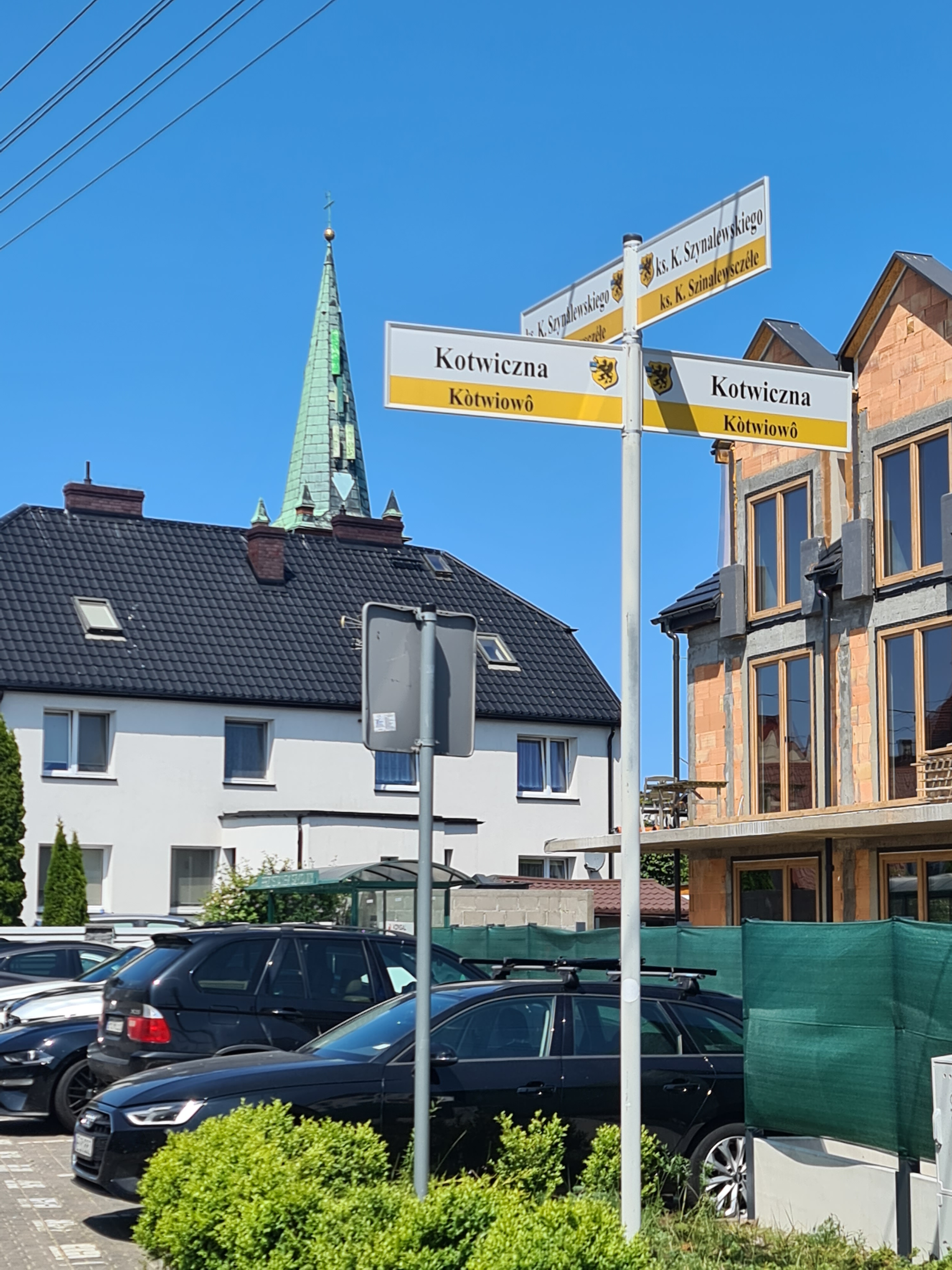
Bilingual Polish and Kashubian street signage in the town of Kuźnica

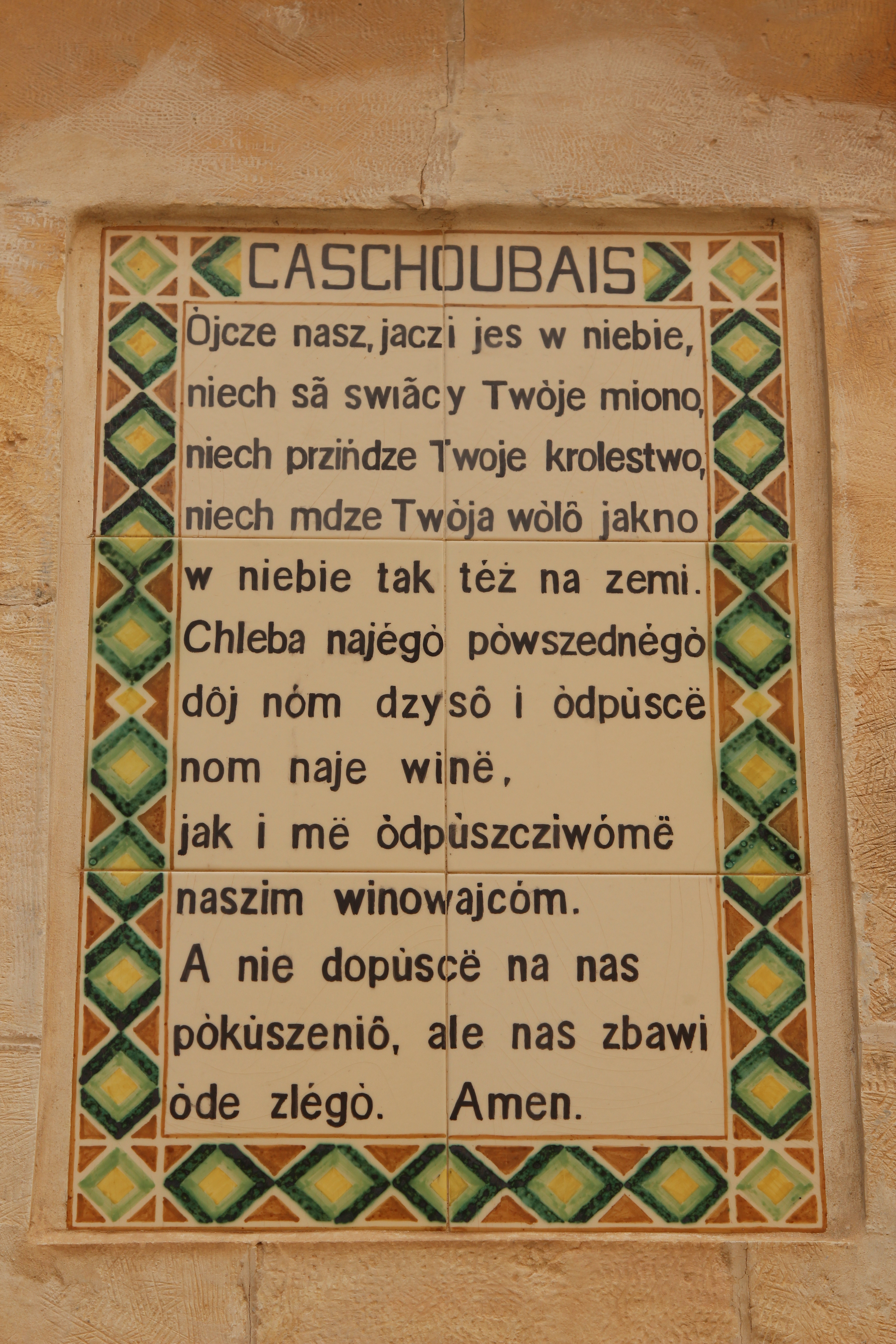
The Lord's Prayer in Kashubian at the Pater Noster Church, Mount of Olives, in Jerusalem.

In the 2021 Population Census, about 87,600 people declared Kashubian as their language used at home, a decrease from 108,100 in the 2011 Census.

The classification of Kashubian as a language or dialect has been controversial. From a diachronic point of view of historical linguistics, Kashubian, like Slovincian, Polabian and Polish, is a Lechitic West Slavic language, while from a synchronic point of view it is a group of Polish dialects. Given the past nationalist interests of Germans and Poles in Kashubia, Barbour and Carmichel state: "As is always the case with the division of a dialect continuum into separate languages, there is scope here for manipulation."

A "standard" Kashubian language does not exist despite attempts to create one, rather a variety of dialects are spoken that differ significantly from each other. The vocabulary is influenced by both German and Polish.

There are other traditional Slavic ethnic groups inhabiting Pomerania, including the Kociewiacy, Borowiacy and Krajniacy. These dialects tend to fall between Kashubian and the Polish dialects of Greater Poland and Mazovia, with Krajniak dialect indeed heavily influenced by Kashubian, while Borowiak and Kociewiak dialects much more closer to Greater Polish and Mazovian. No obvious Kashubian substrate or any other influence is visible in Kociewiak dialect. This indicates that they are not only descendants of Pomeranians, but also of settlers who arrived in Pomerania from Greater Poland and Masovia during the Middle Ages, from the 10th century onwards.

In the 16th and 17th century Michael Brüggemann (also known as Pontanus or Michał Mostnik), Simon Krofey (Szimon Krofej) and J.M. Sporgius introduced Kashubian into the Lutheran Church. Krofey, pastor in Bütow (Bytow), published a religious song book in 1586, written in Polish but also containing some Kashubian words. Brüggemann, pastor in Schmolsin, published a Polish translation of some works of Martin Luther (catechism) and biblical texts, also containing Kashubian elements. Other biblical texts were published in 1700 by Sporgius, pastor in Schmolsin. His Schmolsiner Perikopen, most of which is written in the same Polish-Kashubian style as Krofey's and Brüggemann's books, also contain small passages ("6th Sunday after Epiphany") written in pure Kashubian. Scientific interest in the Kashubian language was sparked by Christoph Mrongovius (publications in 1823, 1828), Florian Ceynowa and the Russian linguist Aleksander Hilferding (1859, 1862), later followed by Leon Biskupski (1883, 1891), Gotthelf Bronisch (1896, 1898), Jooseppi Julius Mikkola (1897), Kazimierz Nitsch (1903). Important works are S. Ramult's, Słownik jezyka pomorskiego, czyli kaszubskiego, 1893, and Friedrich Lorentz, Slovinzische Grammatik, 1903, Slovinzische Texte, 1905, and Slovinzisches Wörterbuch, 1908. Zdzisław Stieber was involved in producing linguistic atlases of Kashubian (1964–78).

The first activist of the Kashubian national movement was Florian Ceynowa. Among his accomplishments, he documented the Kashubian alphabet and grammar by 1879 and published a collection of ethnographic-historic stories of the life of the Kashubians (Skórb kaszébsko-slovjnckjé mòvé, 1866–1868). Another early writer in Kashubian was Hieronim Derdowski. The Young Kashubian movement followed, led by author Aleksander Majkowski, who wrote for the paper Zrzësz Kaszëbskô as part of the "Zrzëszincë" group. The group would contribute significantly to the development of the Kashubian literary language. Another important writer in Kashubian was Bernard Sychta (1907–1982).

=== Cultural traditions ===
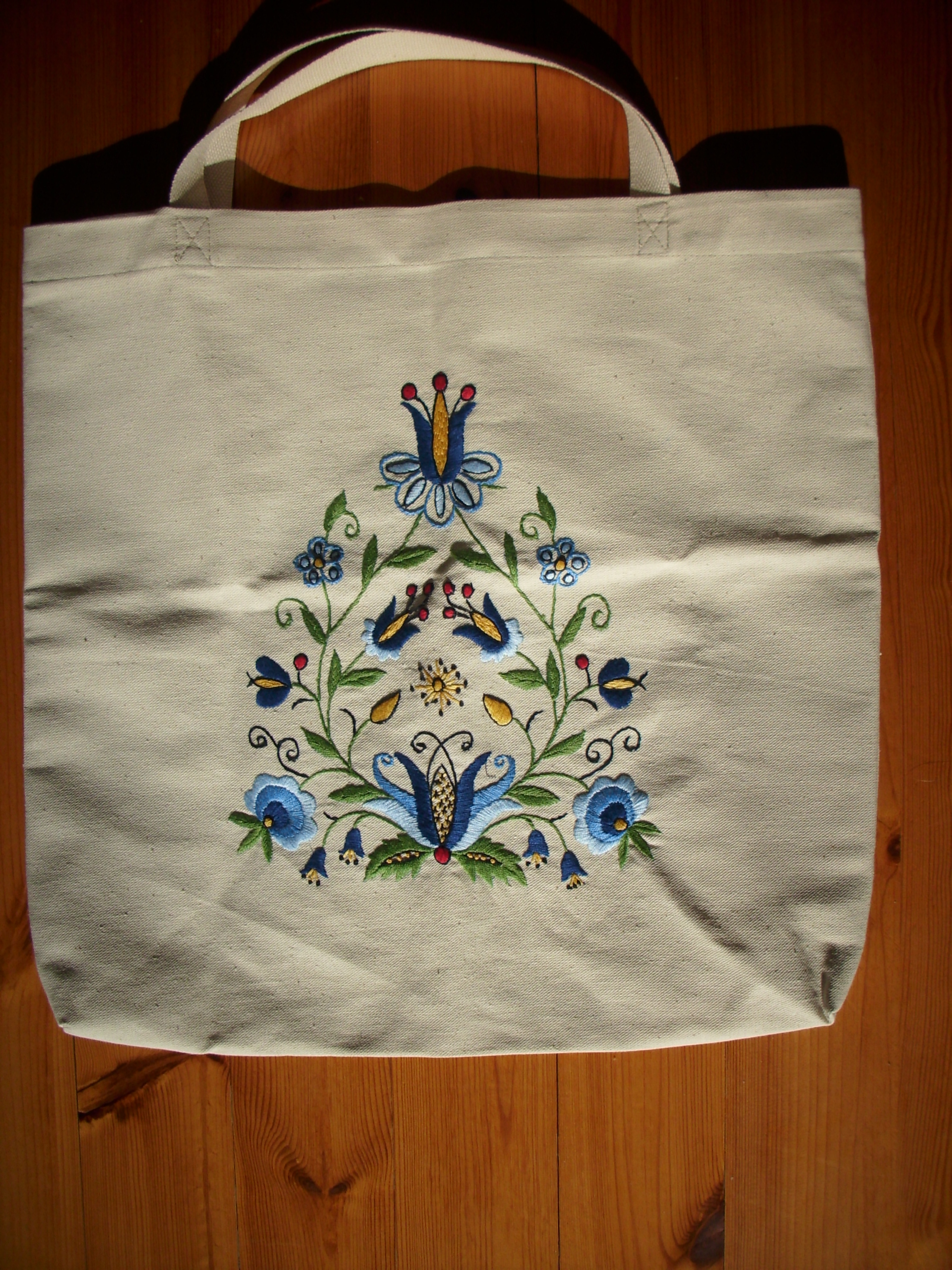
Kashubian embroidery of Żukowo school

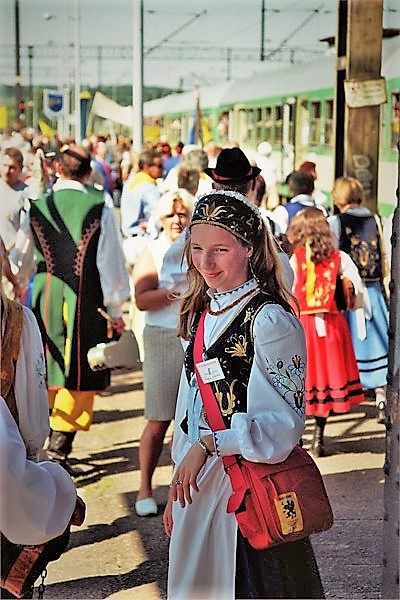
Kashubian regional dress

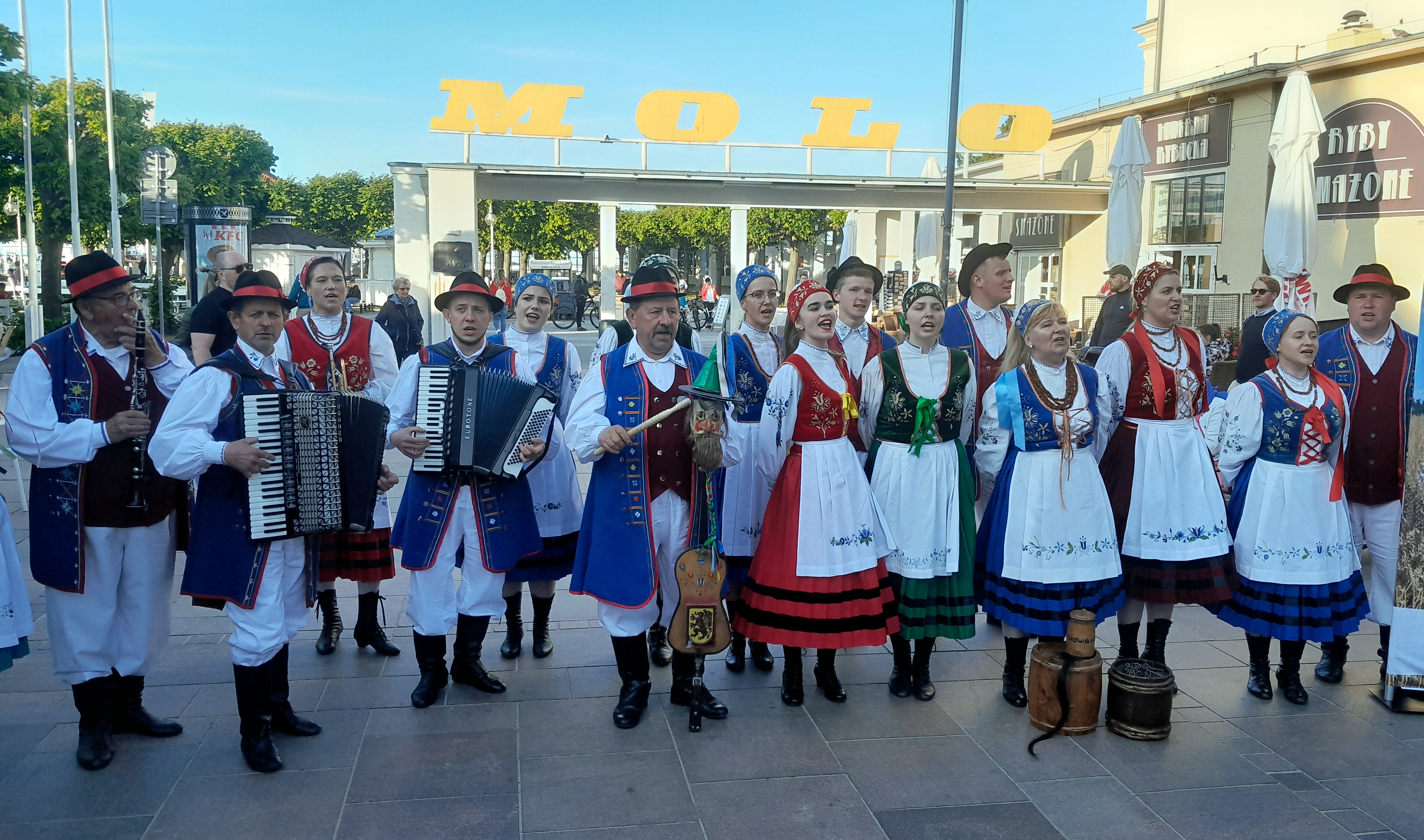
Ethnic Kashubians performing folk songs in Sopot

Similarly to the traditions in other parts of Central and Eastern Europe, pussy willows have been adopted as an alternative to the palm leaves used in Palm Sunday celebrations, which were not obtainable in Kashubia. They were blessed by priests on Palm Sunday, following which parishioners whipped each other with the pussy willow branches, saying Wierzba bije, jô nie bijã. Za tidzéń wiôldżi dzéń, za nocë trzë i trzë są Jastrë ('The willow strikes, it's not me who strikes, in a week, on the great day, in three and three nights, there is the Easter').

The pussy willows, blessed by priests, were treated as sacred charms that could prevent lightning strikes, protect animals, and encourage honey production. They were believed to bring health and good fortune to people as well, and it was traditional for one pussy willow bud to be swallowed on Palm Sunday to promote good health.

According to the old tradition, on Easter Monday the Kashub boys chase girls whipping gently their legs with juniper twigs. This is to bring good fortune in love to the chased girls. This was usually accompanied by a boy's chant Dyngus, dyngus – pò dwa jaja, Nie chcã chleba, leno jaja ('Dyngus, dyngus, for two eggs; I don't want bread but eggs'). Sometimes a girl would be whipped when still in her bed. Girls would give boys painted eggs.

Pottery, one of the ancient Kashubians crafts, has survived to the present day. Famous is Kashubian embroidery and Kashubian embroidering Zukowo school is important intangible cultural heritage.

Pope John Paul II visited in June 1987 and appealed to the Kashubians to preserve their traditional values including their language.

=== Today ===
In 2005, Kashubian was for the first time made an official subject on the Polish matura exam (roughly equivalent to the English A-Level and French Baccalaureat). This development was seen as an important step in the official recognition and establishment of the language. Today, in some towns and villages in northern Poland, Kashubian is the second language spoken after Polish, and it is taught in some regional schools.

Since 2005 Kashubian enjoys legal protection in Poland as an official regional language. It is the only tongue in Poland with this status. It was granted by an act of the Polish Parliament on 6 January 2005. Old Kashubian culture has partially survived in architecture and folk crafts such as pottery, plaiting, embroidery, amber-working, sculpturing and glasspainting.

In the 2011 census, 233,000 people in Poland declared their identity as Kashubian, 216,000 declaring it together with Polish and 16,000 as their only national-ethnic identity. Kaszëbskô Jednota is an association of people who have the latter view.

According to the 2021 census, 179 685 people declared Kashubian identity but only 11 961 (6,7% of total) people declared it as their only identity. A vast majority of 166 839 (92,9% of total) declared it together with Polish identity.

== Kashubian cuisine ==
Kashubian cuisine contains many elements from the wider European culinary tradition. Local specialities include:

- Czarnina (Czarwina) – a type of soup made of goose blood
- Brzadowô zupa – a kind of sweet soup with e.g. apples
- Kaszëbsczi kùch marchewny (Kashubian carrot cake)
- Plińce
- Prażnica

== Genetics ==
According to a study published in 2015, by far the most common Y-DNA haplogroup among the Kashubs (n=204) who live in Kashubia, is haplogroup R1a, which is carried by 61.8% of Kashubian males. It is followed in frequency by I1 (13.2%), R1b (9.3%), I2 (4.4%), E1b1b (3.4%), J (2.5%), G (2%) and N1 (1.5%). Other haplogroups are 2%. Another study from 2010 (n=64) discovered similar proportions of most haplogroups (R1a - 68.8%, I1 – 12.5%, R1b - 7.8%, I2 – 3.1%, E1b1b - 3.1%), but found also Q1a in 3.1% of Kashubians. This study reported no significant differences between Kashubians from Poland and other Poles as far as Y chromosome polymorphism is regarded. When it comes to mitochondrial DNA haplogroups, according to a January 2013 study, the most common major mtDNA lineages among the Kashubians, each carried by at least 2.5% of their population, include J1 (12.3%), H1 (11.8%), H* (8.9%), T* (5.9%), T2 (5.4%), U5a (5.4%), U5b (5.4%), U4a (3.9%), H10 (3.9%), H11 (3.0%), H4 (3.0%), K (3.0%), V (3.0%), H2a (2.5%) and W (2.5%). Altogether they account for almost 8/10 of the total Kashubian mtDNA diversity.

In a 2013 study, Y-DNA haplogroups among the Polish population indigenous to Kociewie (n=158) were reported as follows:

56.3% R1a, 17.7% R1b, 8.2% I1, 7.6% I2, 3.8% E1b1b, 1.9% N1, 1.9% J and 2% of other haplogroups.

== Diaspora ==
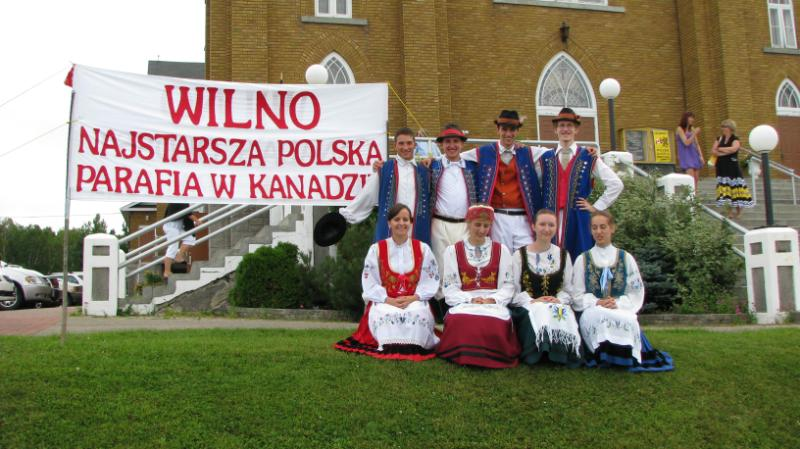
Polish-Canadians wearing traditional Kashubian costumes in Wilno, Ontario, the oldest Polish settlement in Canada.

Immigrant Kashubians kept a distinct identity among Polish Canadians and Polish Americans.

From 1858 to 1907, families of Kashubians, primarily from the areas surrounding Kościerzyna, emigrated to Upper Canada, largely settling in what is now western Renfrew County in Ontario. The relative isolation and difficult terrain of the area resulted in the preservation of many cultural traditions in the area, including that of the Kashubian language, which is still known by many older residents today. Additionally, communities such as Killaloe, Wilno and Barry's Bay continue to have large Polish/Kashub populations with 38.8% and 43.5% of the populations of Killaloe, Hagarty and Richards and Madawaska Valley townships respectively claiming Polish as a cultural or ethnic origin in the 2021 Canadian census.

Kashubian immigrants founded St. Josaphat parish in Chicago's Lincoln Park community in the late 19th century, as well as the parish of Immaculate Heart of Mary in Irving Park, the vicinity of which was dubbed as "Little Cassubia". In the 1870s a fishing village was established in Jones Island in Milwaukee, Wisconsin, by Kashubian immigrants. The settlers however did not hold deeds to the land, and the government of Milwaukee evicted them as squatters in the 1940s, with the area soon after turned into industrial park. The last trace of this Milwaukee fishing village that had been settled by Kashubians on Jones Island is in the name of the smallest park in the city, Kaszube's Park.

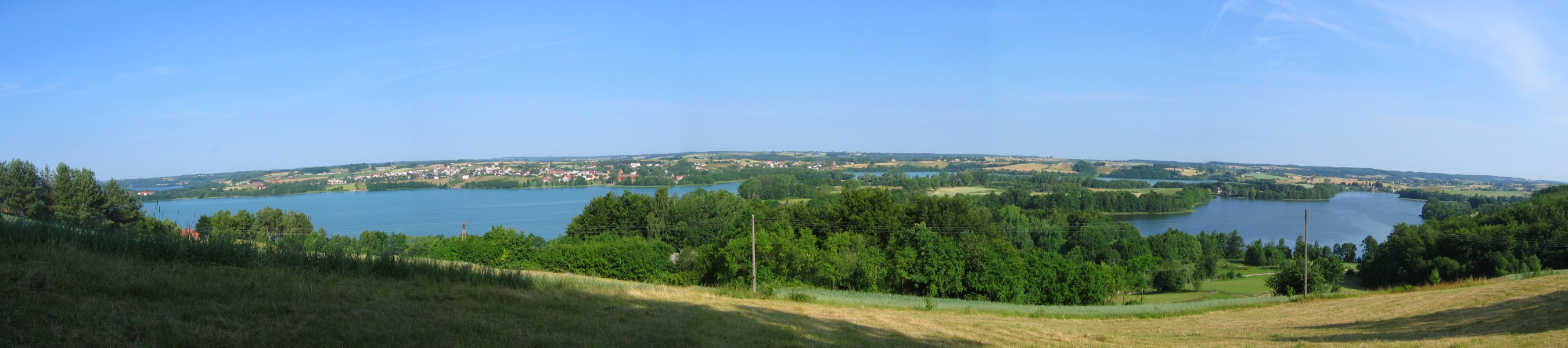
Kashubian Landscape Park, View from Tamowa Mountain, near Kartuzy and Lakes Kłodno, Białe, and Rekowo.

== Notable Kashubs ==
- Lech Bądkowski (1920–1984) writer, journalist, translator, political, cultural, and social activist
- Joshua C. Blank (1984- ), historian, award-winning author, teacher, Swastek prize winner
- Józef Borzyszkowski (1946– ) historian, politician, founder of the Kashubian Institute
- Edward Breza (1932–2017) award winner etymologist, and professor
- Paul Breza (1937–2025) American priest, Kashubian-American activist
- Jerzy Łysk (1950– ) Kashubian poet, composer, singer and cultural animator, manager of cultural institutions.
- Jan Romuald Byzewski (1842–1905) Kashubian-born American priest and social activist
- Florian Ceynowa (1817–1881) political activist, writer, linguist, and revolutionary
- Arnold Chrapkowski (1968– ) Father General of the Order of Saint Paul the First Hermit
- Hieronim Derdowski (1852–1902) Kashubian-born American writer, newspaper editor, and political activist
- Konstantyn Dominik (1870–1942) auxiliary bishop of Chełmno (now Pelplin)
- Jan Gierszewski (1882–1951), co-founder of the secret WW2 military organization Kashubian Griffin, Code name "Major Rys"
- Günter Grass (1927–2015) Nobel Prize-winning German author of Kashubian descent
- Hilary Jastak (1914–2000) a Polish priest prelate, Doctor of Theology, Chaplain of Solidarity movement, Major of Polish Armed Forces, Lieutenant Commander of Polish Navy.
- Marian Jeliński (1949– ) Veterinarian, author, Kashubian activist
- Wojciech Kasperski (1981– ) film director, screenwriter
- Józef Kos (1900–2007) World War I veteran
- Gerard Labuda (1916–2010) historian
- Mark Lilla (1956–) American writer, intellectual historian
- Aleksander Majkowski (1876–1938) author, publicist, play writer, cultural activist
- Marian Majkowski (1926–2012) author, architect
- Paul Mattick (1904–1981) German-American Marxist writer of Kashubian descent
- Mestwin II (1220–1294) ruler of united Eastern Pomerania
- Jerzy Samp (1951–2015) writer, publicist, historian, and social activist
- Wawrzyniec Samp (1939– ) sculptor and graphic artist
- Franziska Schanzkowska (1896–1984); a.k.a. Anna Anderson, impostor who claimed to be, Anastasia Romanova, daughter of Tsar Nicholas II
- Danuta Stenka (1962– ) actress
- Swantopolk II (1195–1266) powerful ruler of Eastern Pomerania
- Brunon Synak (1943–2013) professor of sociology and a Kashubian activist
- Jerzy Treder (1942–2015), philologist and linguist, known as an expert in Kashubian studies
- Jan Trepczyk (1907–1989) poet, songwriter, lexicographer and creator of the Polish-Kashubian dictionary
- Donald Tusk (1957– ) historian, politician, leader of Civic Platform, Prime Minister of Poland and President of the European Council
- Ludwig Yorck von Wartenburg (1759–1830) Prussian Field Marshal of the Napoleonic era
- Erich von Manstein (Fritz Erich Georg Eduard von Lewinski) (1887–1973), German Field Marshal
- Friedrich Bogislav von Tauentzien 1710 in Tawęcino (German:Tauenzien), † 21. März 1791 in Wrocław (Breslau)/ Prussian General
- Erich von dem Bach-Zelewski (1899–1972) Nazi war criminal and pioneer of genocidal anti-partisan tactics
- Emil von Zelewski (1854–1891), Prussian officer
- Paul Yakabuski (1922–1987), First Kashubian MPP elected in Canada in 1963

== In literature ==
Important for Kashubian literature was Xążeczka dlo Kaszebov by Doctor Florian Ceynowa (1817–1881). Hieronim Derdowski (1852–1902) was another significant author who wrote in Kashubian, as was Doctor Aleksander Majkowski (1876–1938) from Kościerzyna, who wrote the Kashubian national epic The Life and Adventures of Remus. Jan Trepczyk was a poet who wrote in Kashubian, as was Stanisław Pestka. Kashubian literature has been translated into Czech, Polish, English, German, Belarusian, Slovene and Finnish. A considerable body of Christian literature has been translated into Kashubian, including the New Testament and Book of Genesis.

== See also ==
- Kashubian alphabet
- Kashubian diaspora
- Kashubian language
- Kashubian studies
- Kashubian Americans
