= Kashubian studies =

Philological discipline, a branch of Slavic studies

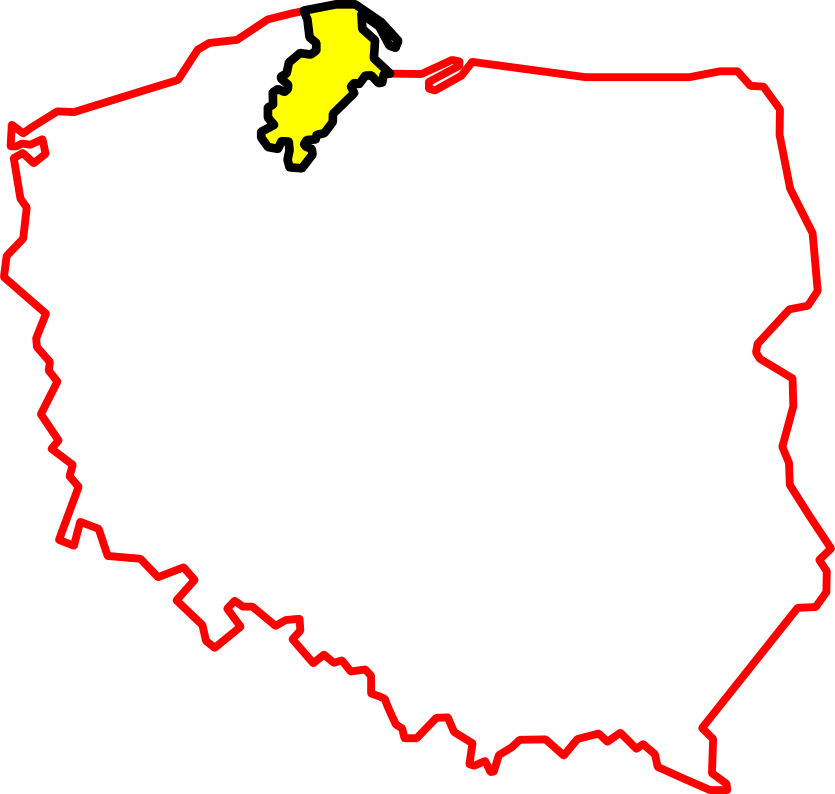
Location of Kashubia in Poland

Kashubian studies, a branch of Slavic studies, is a philological discipline researching the language, literature, culture, and history of the Kashubians.

The main centre for development of Kashubian studies is the University of Gdańsk, Poland - since 2014 Kashubian Ethno-Philology Studies at Gdańsk University. Since 2009, the Institute of Polish Language and Literature at the university has operated a teaching specialisation: teaching of Polish and Kashubian language and culture studies (Kashubian studies) within its Polish studies program. It is in accordance with Article 8, paragraph 1 a (i), b (i), c (i), d (iii), e (ii) of the European Charter for Regional or Minority Languages, which is in force in Poland, and concerns the opportunity to learn regional languages at all levels, from preschool to university.

Since 1999, the Kashubian Institute has published an interdisciplinary journal on Kashubian studies, Acta Cassubiana.
