= Brodnica (disambiguation) =

Brodnica is a town in Poland.

Brodnica may also refer to:

- Sparta Brodnica, a Polish football club playing currently in Polish Fourth League
- Brodnica Landscape Park, a protected area (Landscape Park) in north-central Poland, established in 1985
- Brodnica County, a unit of territorial administration and local government (powiat) in Kuyavian-Pomeranian Voivodeship
- Brodnica, Greater Poland Voivodeship, a village in Śrem County, Greater Poland Voivodeship
- Brodnica Dolna, a village in the administrative district of Gmina Kartuzy
- Brodnica Górna, a village in Kartuzy County, Pomeranian Voivodeship, Poland
- Gmina Brodnica (disambiguation), multiple administrative districts in Poland

== See also ==
- Brodnicki
