= Smętowo =

Smętowo can mean these places in Poland

- Smętowo Graniczne, in Starogard County, Pomeranian Voivodeship
- Smętowo Chmieleńskie a village in Kartuzy County, Pomeranian Voivodeship
- Smętowo Leśne, a village in Kartuzy County, Pomeranian Voivodeship
