= Chojna (disambiguation) =

Chojna may refer to the following places:

- Chojna, Międzychód County in Greater Poland Voivodeship (west-central Poland)
- Chojna, Wągrowiec County in Greater Poland Voivodeship (west-central Poland)
- Chojna in West Pomeranian Voivodeship (north-west Poland)
- Chojna, Lubusz Voivodeship (west Poland)
- Chojna, Gmina Kartuzy in Pomeranian Voivodeship (north Poland)
- Chojna, Gmina Sulęczyno in Pomeranian Voivodeship (north Poland)
