= Borowo, Kartuzy County =

Borowo Bòrowò
- Village
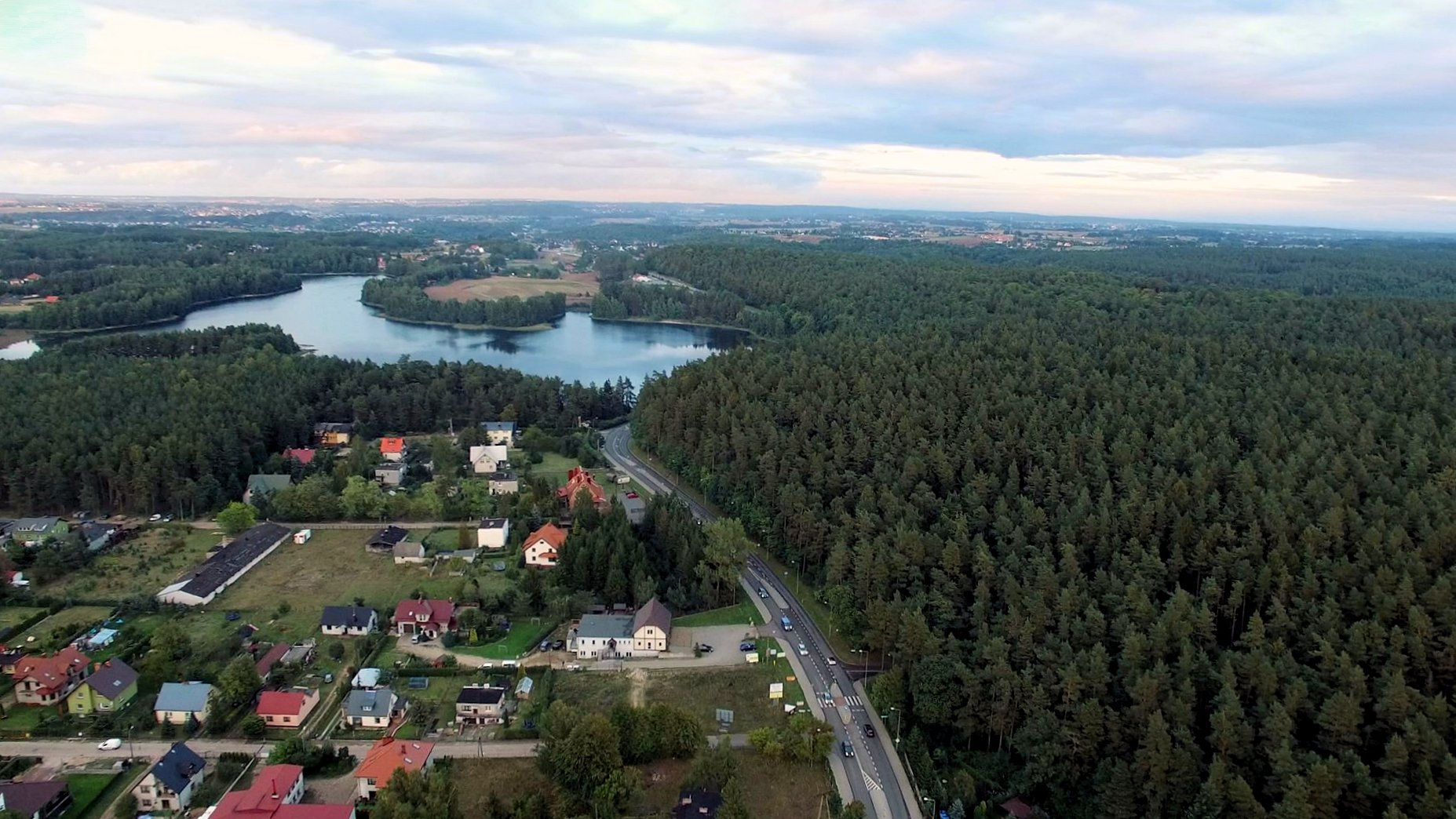
- Aerial view of Borowo and Karlikowskie Lake

- Location within Poland
- Coordinates: 54°19′8″N 18°17′18″E
- Country: Poland
- Voivodeship: Pomeranian
- County: Kartuzy
- Gmina: Kartuzy
- Population: 776
- Time zone: UTC+1 (CET)
  - Summer (DST): UTC+2 (CEST)
- Vehicle registration: GKA

Borowo [bɔˈrɔvɔ] (Kashubian: Bòrowò) is a village in the administrative district of Gmina Kartuzy, within Kartuzy County, Pomeranian Voivodeship, in northern Poland. It is located in the ethnocultural region of Kashubia in the historic region of Pomerania.

== History ==
During the German occupation of Poland (World War II), the occupiers operated a subcamp of the prison in Kartuzy in the village. It was one of the places of imprisonment of Poles from nearby towns and villages who were arrested by the German gendarmerie, Einsatzkommando 16 and Selbstschutz during the Intelligenzaktion in 1939, before their executions in the nearby Kaliska forest.
