= Kamienna Góra (disambiguation) =

Kamienna Góra may refer to the following places:

- Kamienna Góra in Lower Silesian Voivodeship (south-west Poland)
- Kamienna Góra, Lublin Voivodeship (east Poland)
- Kamienna Góra, Kielce County in Świętokrzyskie Voivodeship (south-central Poland)
- Kamienna Góra, Opatów County in Świętokrzyskie Voivodeship (south-central Poland)
- Kamienna Góra, Opole Voivodeship (south-west Poland)
- Kamienna Góra, Kartuzy County in Pomeranian Voivodeship (north Poland)
- Kamienna Góra, Sztum County in Pomeranian Voivodeship (north Poland)
- Kamienna Góra, West Pomeranian Voivodeship (north-west Poland)
