= Prokowo railway station =

Railway station in Prokowo, Poland

Coordinates: 54.3597°N 18.1567°E

Prokowo
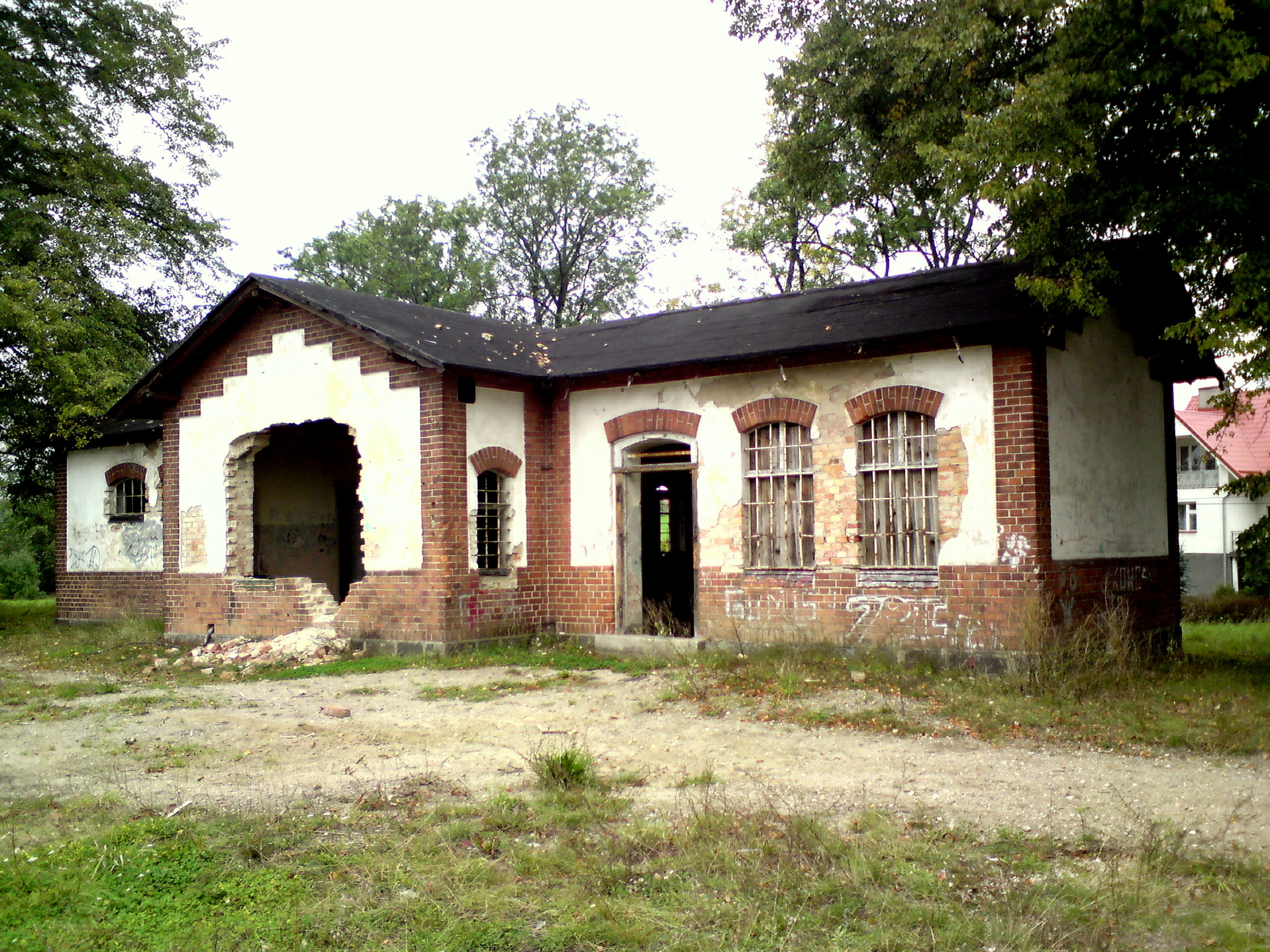

General information
- Location: Prokowo; Poland
- Owner: Polskie Koleje Państwowe S.A.

Construction
- Structure type: Building: No; Depot: Never existed Water tower: Never existed

History
- Former names: Prockau until 1945
Location
- Location within Pomeranian Voivodeship Location within Poland

Prokowo is a non-operational PKP railway station in Prokowo (Pomeranian Voivodeship), Poland.

== Lines crossing the station ==
Start station	End station	Line type
Pruszcz Gdański	Łeba	Freight
