= Brodnicki =

Brodnicki (Polish pronunciation: [brɔdˈnit͡ski]; feminine: Brodnicka; plural: Brodniccy) is a surname of Polish-language origin. It means "of Brodnica" or "from Brodnica".

== People ==
- Ewa Brodnicka (born 1984), a Polish boxer
- Pascal Brodnicki (born 1976), a Polish-French cook

== See also ==
- Brodnica Landscape Park (Polish: Brodnicki Park Krajobrazowy)
- Brodnica County (Polish: powiat brodnicki)
- Kamionka Brodnicka
- Brodnica (disambiguation)
- Brudnicki, Brudnitzki
