= Stążki =

Stążki may refer to the following places:

- Stążki, Kuyavian-Pomeranian Voivodeship (north-central Poland)
- Stążki, Kartuzy County in Pomeranian Voivodeship (north Poland)
- Stążki, Sztum County in Pomeranian Voivodeship (north Poland)
