= Sarnówko =

Sarnówko may refer to the following places:

- Sarnówko, Kuyavian-Pomeranian Voivodeship (north-central Poland)
- Sarnówko, Gmina Kartuzy in Pomeranian Voivodeship (north Poland)
- Sarnówko, Gmina Somonino in Pomeranian Voivodeship (north Poland)
