= Raj =

Raj or RAJ may refer to:

== Indian history ==
- British Raj, the British rule in India from 1858 to 1947 (the territory sometimes being informally called the Indian Empire)
- Company Raj, the British East India Company rule in the Indian subcontinent
- Licence Raj or Permit Raj, the Indian system of elaborate licences and permits, regulations and accompanying red tape
- Mafia Raj (also Goonda Raj or Jungle Raj), where public property and funds are controlled by a criminalised nexus of politicians and business interests

== Places ==
- Ráj, a village in the Czech Republic
- Raj, Masovian Voivodeship, Poland
- Raj, Pomeranian Voivodeship, Poland
- Raj, Warmian-Masurian Voivodeship, Poland
- Brazii (Hungarian: Raj), Arad County, Romania
- Rajasthan, a state of India

== People ==
- Raj (name), including a list of people and fictional characters with the name
  - Thotakura Somaraju or Raj (c. 1954–2003), one-half of the Indian musical duo Raj–Koti

== Other uses ==
- Raj Comics, Indian comic book publisher
- Raj TV, a Tamil channel in Chennai, India
- Raj Engineering College, Jodhpur, Rajasthan, India
- Rajasthani language
- Rajkot Airport, Gujarat, India
- Rajpipla railway station, Narmada district, Gujarat, India
- Russian State University of Justice, formerly known as the Russian Academy of Justice (RAJ)
- Raj, a program by Polish composer Przemysław Gintrowski

== See also ==
- Raja (disambiguation)
