= Dzierżążno-Leśnictwo =

- Settlement
- Location within Poland
- Coordinates: 54°19′57″N 18°16′57″E
- Country: Poland
- Voivodeship: Pomeranian
- County: Kartuzy
- Gmina: Kartuzy

Dzierżążno-Leśnictwo [d͡ʑɛrˈʐɔ̃ʐnɔ lɛɕˈnit͡stfɔ] is a settlement in the administrative district of Gmina Kartuzy, within Kartuzy County, Pomeranian Voivodeship, in northern Poland.

For details of the history of the region, see History of Pomerania.
