= Kosy, Pomeranian Voivodeship =

Kosy
- Village
- Location within Poland
- Coordinates: 54°19′3″N 18°9′27″E
- Country: Poland
- Voivodeship: Pomeranian
- County: Kartuzy
- Gmina: Kartuzy
- Population: 102

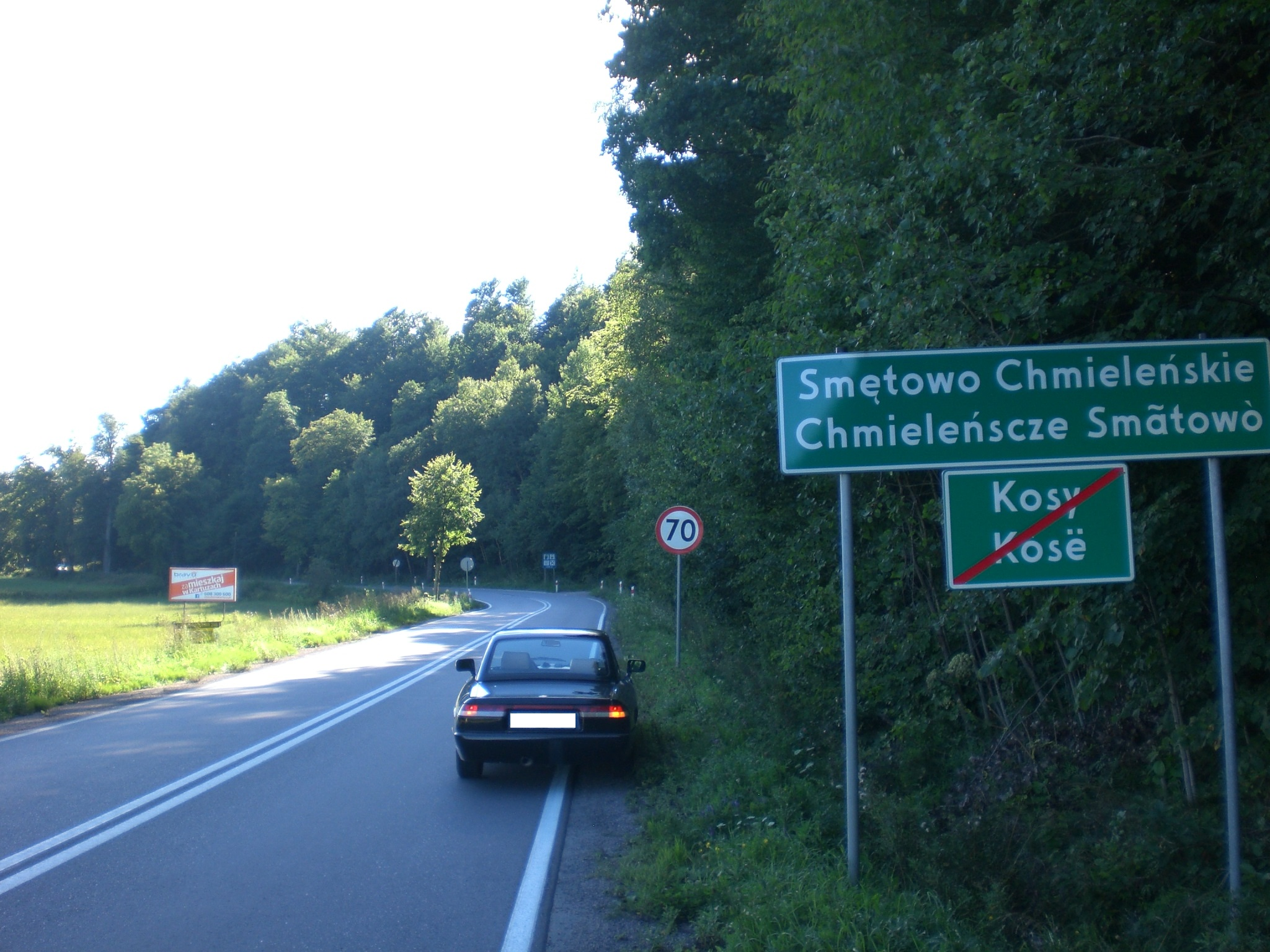
Kosy in Polish and Cashubian

Kosy [ˈkɔsɨ] (Cashubian Kòsë) is a village in the administrative district of Gmina Kartuzy, within Kartuzy County, Pomeranian Voivodeship, in northern Poland.

For details of the history of the region, see History of Pomerania.
