= Pikarnia =

- Village
- Location within Poland
- Coordinates: 54°18′46″N 18°16′52″E
- Country: Poland
- Voivodeship: Pomeranian
- County: Kartuzy
- Gmina: Kartuzy
- Population: 90

Pikarnia [piˈkarɲa] is a village in the administrative district of Gmina Kartuzy, within Kartuzy County, Pomeranian Voivodeship, in northern Poland.

For details of the history of the region, see History of Pomerania.
