= Ręboszewo =

- Village
- Location within Poland
- Coordinates: 54°17′25″N 18°7′19″E
- Country: Poland
- Voivodeship: Pomeranian
- County: Kartuzy
- Gmina: Kartuzy
- Population: 387

Ręboszewo [rɛmbɔˈʂɛvɔ] (Cashubian Rãbòszewò) is a village in the administrative district of Gmina Kartuzy, within Kartuzy County, Pomeranian Voivodeship, in northern Poland.

For details of the history of the region, see History of Pomerania.
