= Kolonia, Pomeranian Voivodeship =

Village in Kashubia

Kolonia Kòloniô
- Village
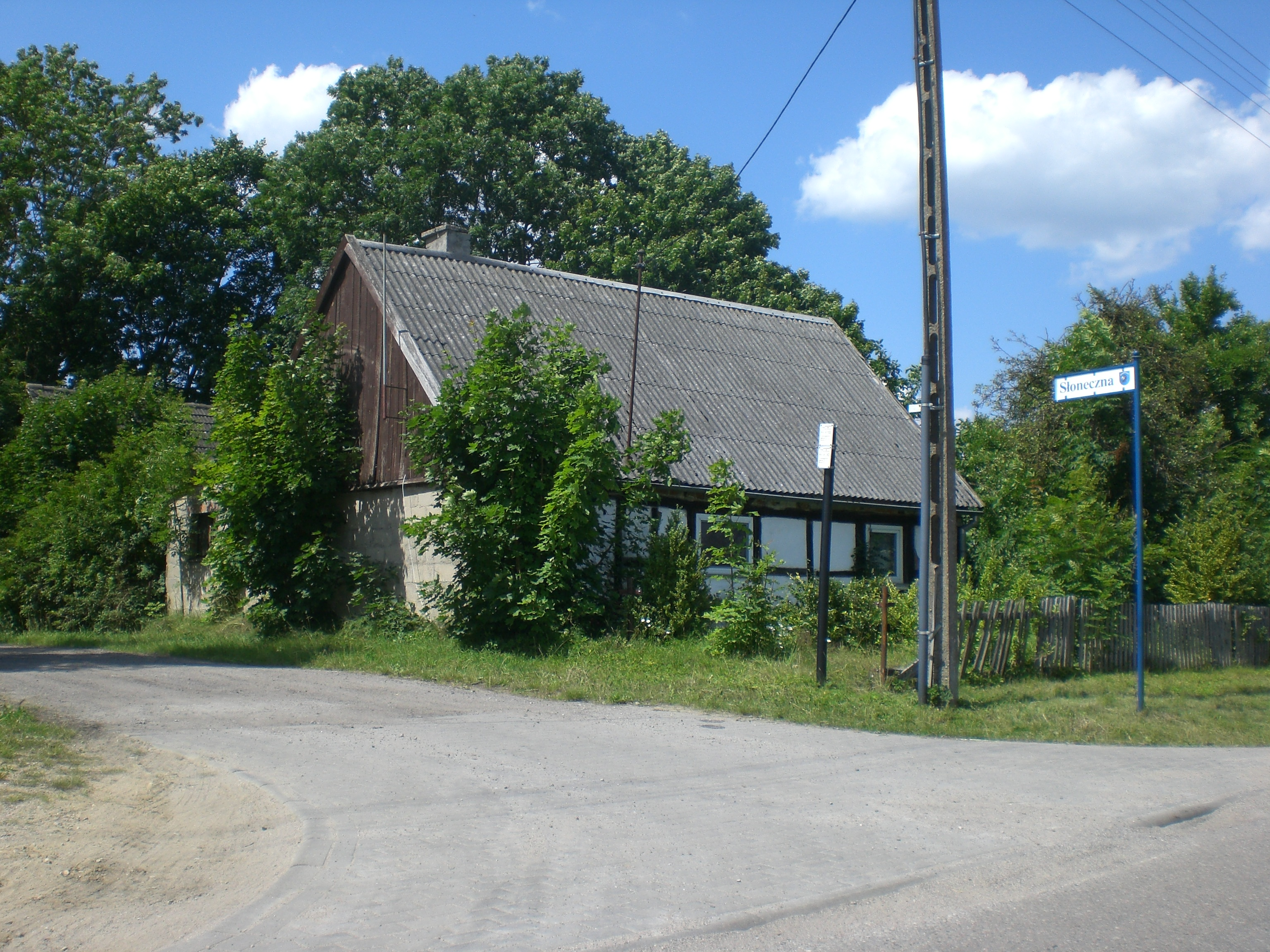

- Location within Poland
- Coordinates: 54°23′49″N 18°6′46″E
- Country: Poland
- Voivodeship: Pomeranian
- County: Kartuzy
- Gmina: Kartuzy
- Population: 806

Kolonia [kɔˈlɔɲa] (Kashubian: Kòloniô) is a village in the administrative district of Gmina Kartuzy, within Kartuzy County, Pomeranian Voivodeship, in northern Poland.

For details of the history of the region, see History of Pomerania.

Village gallery
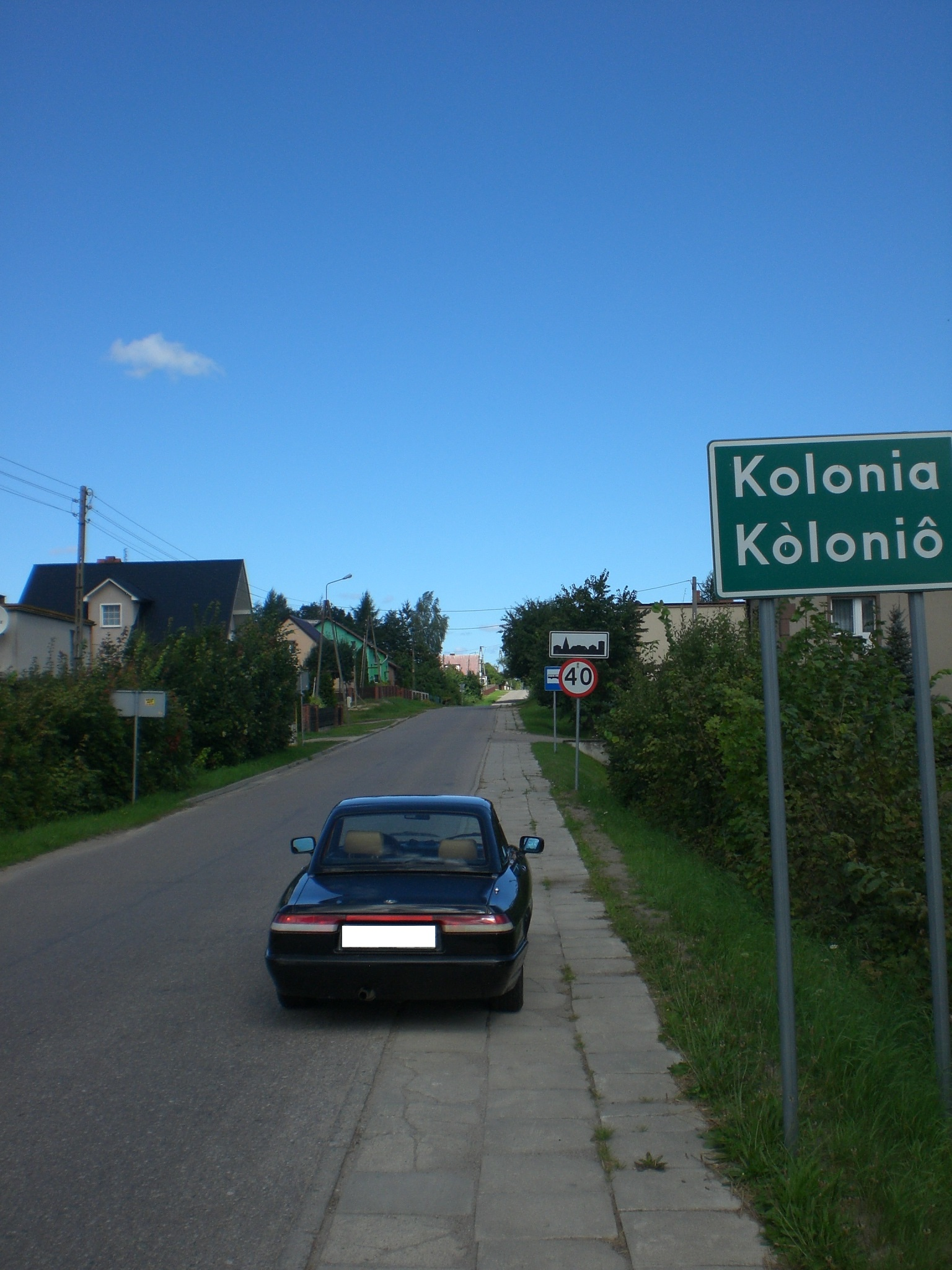
The bilingual Polish-Cashubian sign of the village

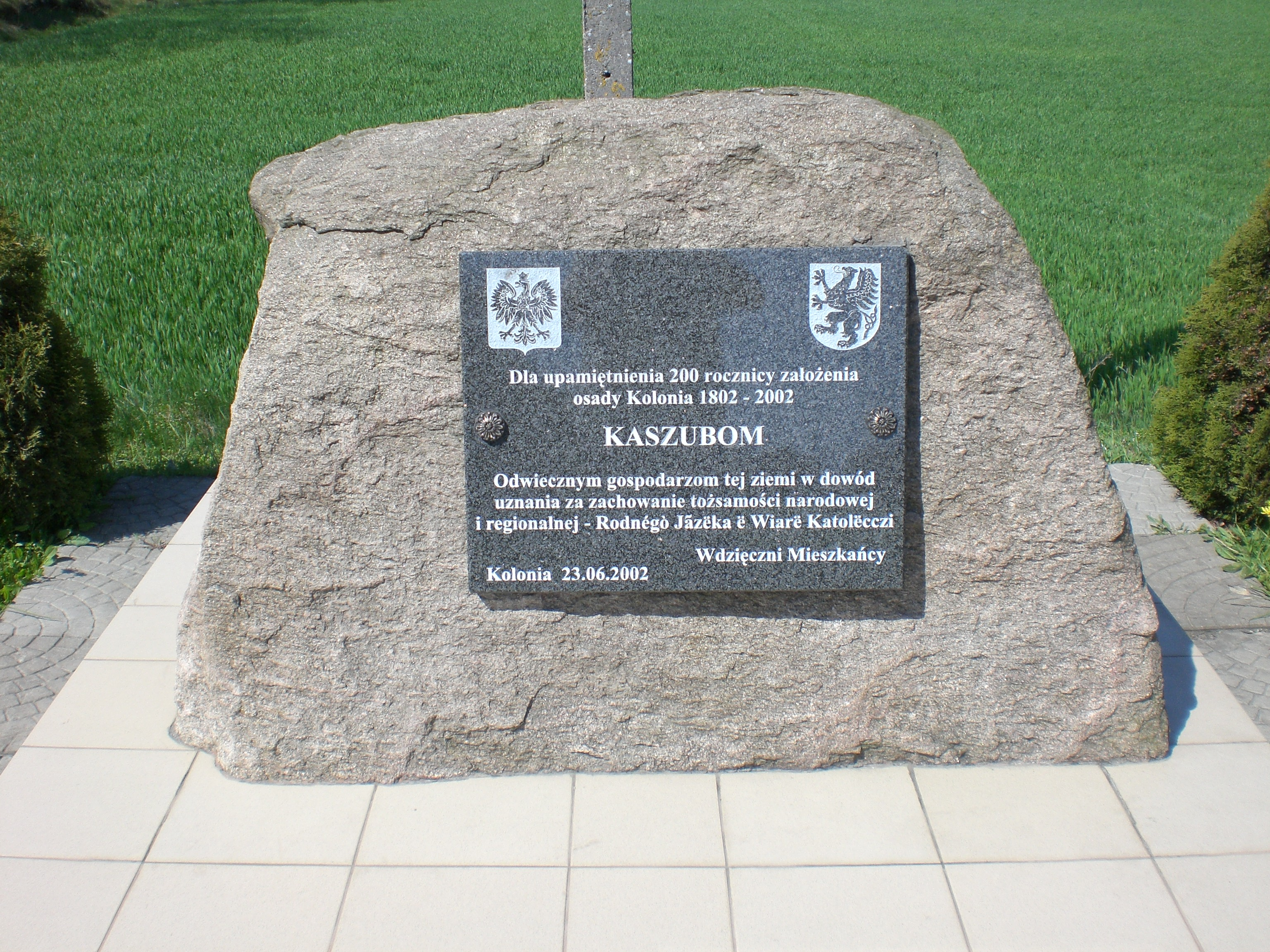
The village's monument to Cashubians
