= Melgrowa Góra =

- Settlement
- Location within Poland
- Coordinates: 54°21′48″N 18°12′26″E
- Country: Poland
- Voivodeship: Pomeranian
- County: Kartuzy
- Gmina: Kartuzy

Melgrowa Góra [mɛlˈɡrɔva ˈɡura] is a settlement in the administrative district of Gmina Kartuzy, within Kartuzy County, Pomeranian Voivodeship, in northern Poland.

For details of the history of the region, see History of Pomerania.
