= Łapalice =

- Village
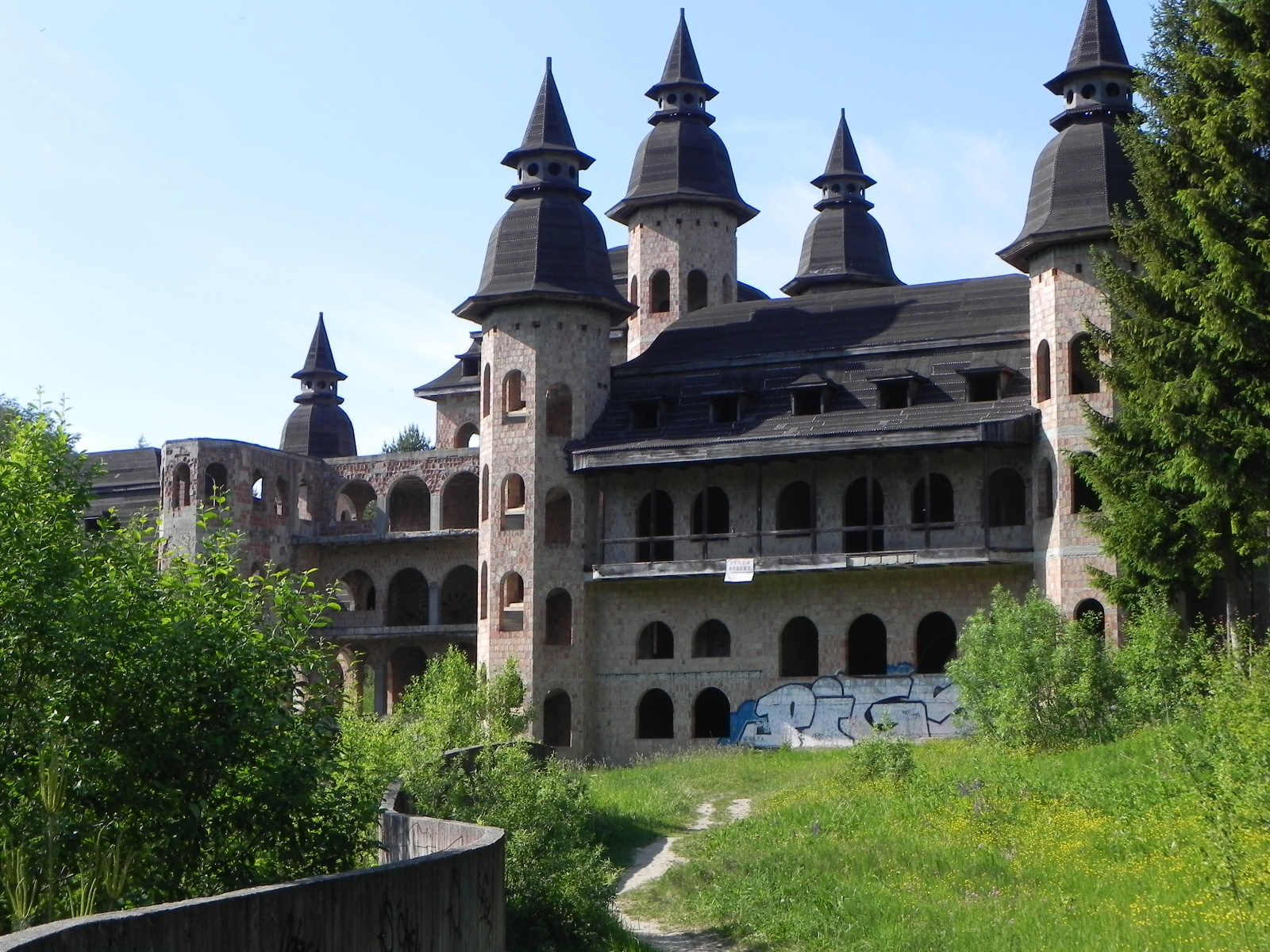
- Castle in Łapalice

- Location within Poland
- Coordinates: 54°20′46″N 18°7′44″E
- Country: Poland
- Voivodeship: Pomeranian
- County: Kartuzy
- Gmina: Kartuzy

Population
  - Total: 787

Łapalice [wapaˈlit͡sɛ] (Kashubian: Łapalëce) is a village in the administrative district of Gmina Kartuzy, within Kartuzy County, Pomeranian Voivodeship, in northern Poland.

For details of the history of the region, see History of Pomerania.
