= Złota Góra, Kartuzy County =

Złota Góra
- Settlement
- Location within Poland
- Coordinates: 54°16′44″N 18°5′52″E
- Country: Poland
- Voivodeship: Pomeranian
- County: Kartuzy
- Gmina: Kartuzy

Złota Góra [ˈzwɔta ˈɡura] is a settlement in the administrative district of Gmina Kartuzy, within Kartuzy County, Pomeranian Voivodeship, in northern Poland.

For details of the history of the region, see History of Pomerania.

There is here every year Strawberry-Picking Festival. In the early 1970s, it was decided that, given the abundance of strawberries, a Strawberry-Picking Festival should be organised. This is an open-air event which takes place every year on the first Sunday in July. The Strawberry-Picking Festival is the big event in Kashubia, with visitor numbers in the tens of thousands, increasing every year.
