= Cieszonko =

Cieszonko Ceszónkò
- Settlement
- Location within Poland
- Coordinates: 54°23′0″N 18°4′54″E
- Country: Poland
- Voivodeship: Pomeranian
- County: Kartuzy
- Gmina: Kartuzy

Cieszonko [t͡ɕɛˈʂɔnkɔ] (Kashubian: Ceszónkò) is a settlement in the administrative district of Gmina Kartuzy, within Kartuzy County, Pomeranian Voivodeship, in northern Poland.
