= Grzybno, Kartuzy County =

Grzybno
- Village
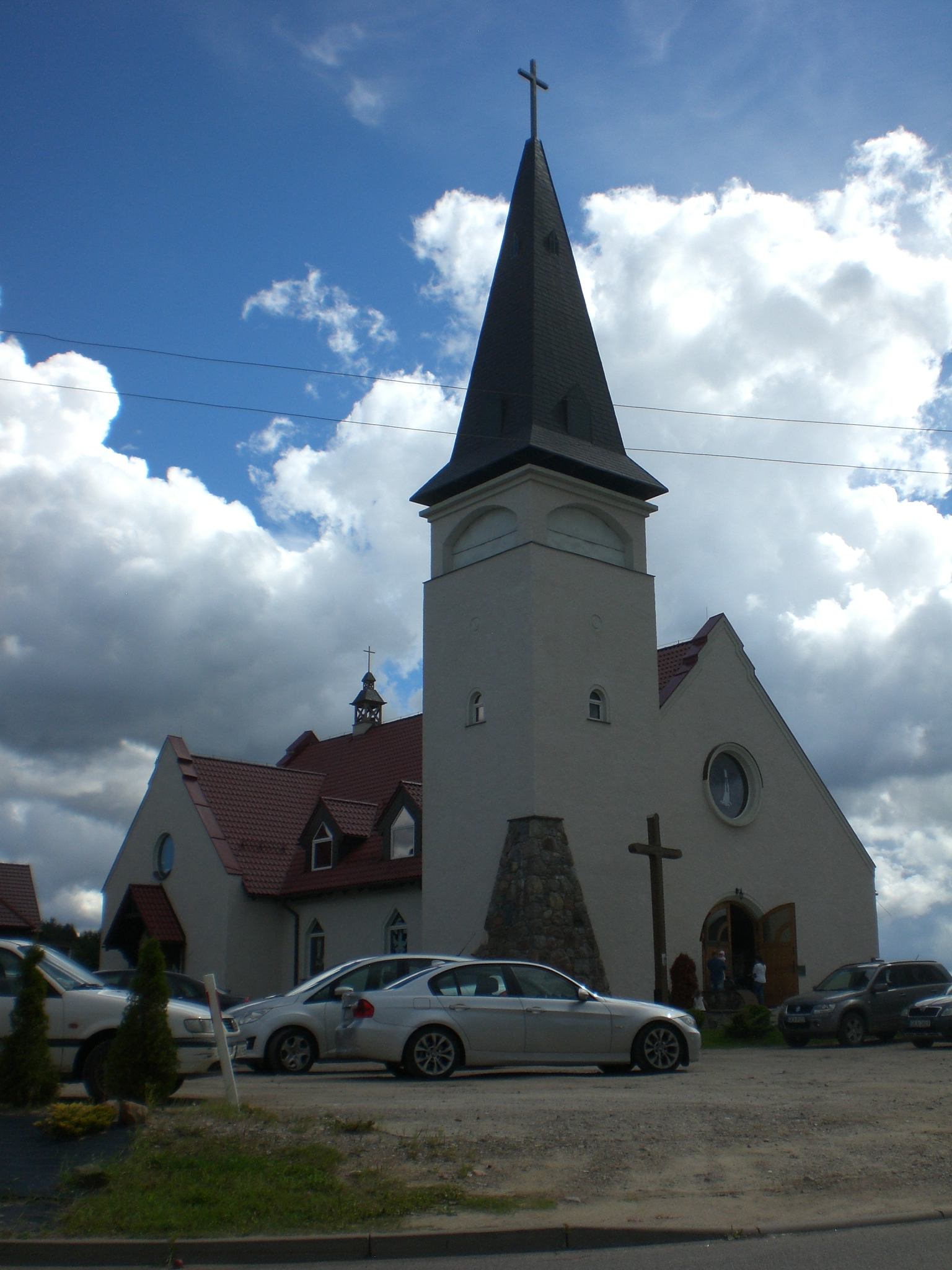

- Location within Poland
- Coordinates: 54°21′8″N 18°13′5″E
- Country: Poland
- Voivodeship: Pomeranian
- County: Kartuzy
- Gmina: Kartuzy
- Population: 1,189

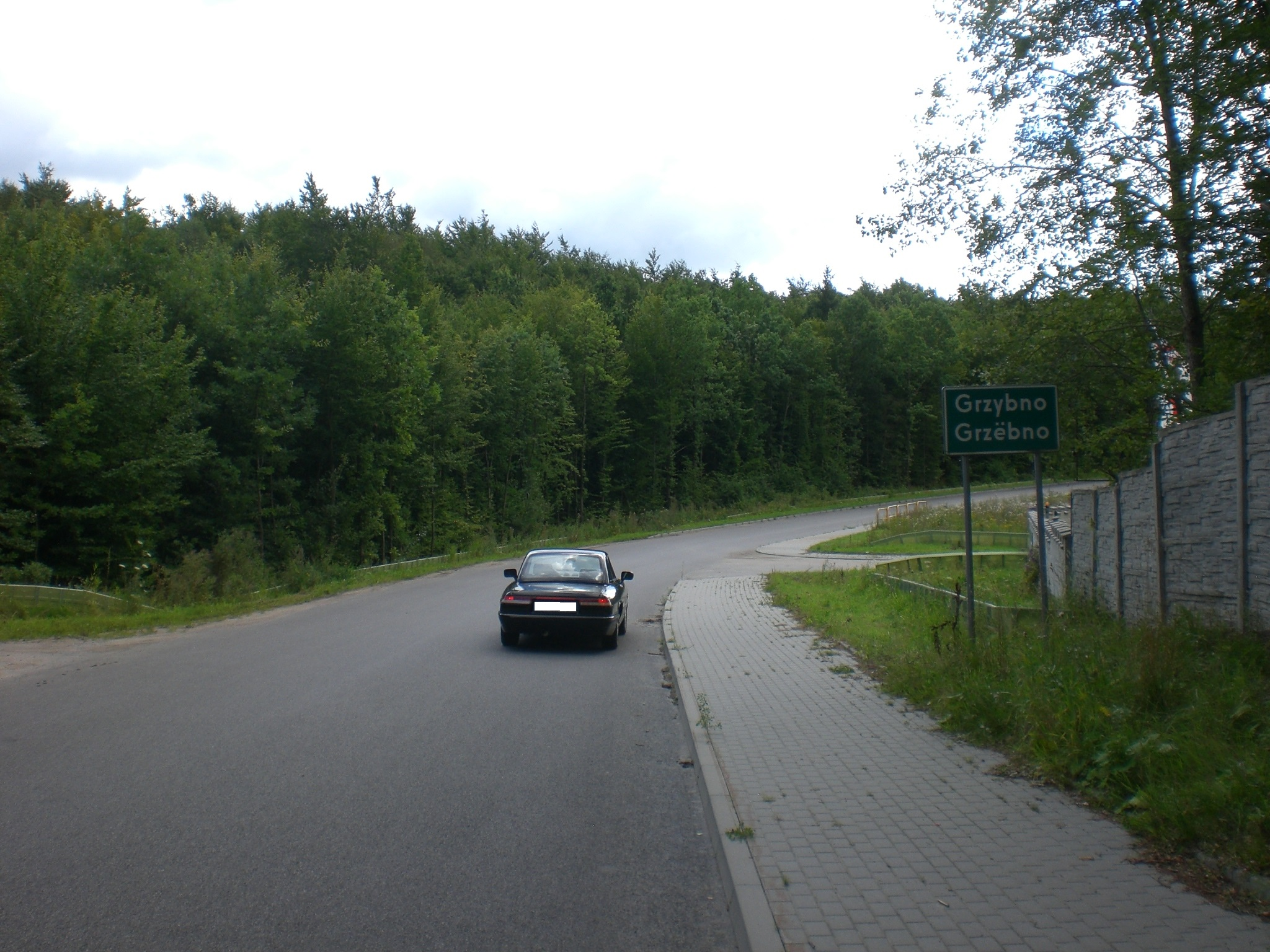
Grzybno in Polish and Cashubian

Grzybno [ˈɡʐɨbnɔ] (Cashubian Grzëbno) is a village in the administrative district of Gmina Kartuzy, within Kartuzy County, Pomeranian Voivodeship, in northern Poland.

For details of the history of the region, see History of Pomerania.
