= Leszno, Kartuzy County =

Leszno
- Village
- Location within Poland
- Coordinates: 54°18′7″N 18°11′54″E
- Country: Poland
- Voivodeship: Pomeranian
- County: Kartuzy
- Gmina: Kartuzy

Leszno [ˈlɛʂnɔ] (Cashubian Lészno) is a village in the administrative district of Gmina Kartuzy, within Kartuzy County, Pomeranian Voivodeship, in northern Poland.

The non-operational Leszno Kartuskie railway station is located here.

For details of the history of the region, see History of Pomerania.
