= Sitno, Pomeranian Voivodeship =

Sitno
- Village
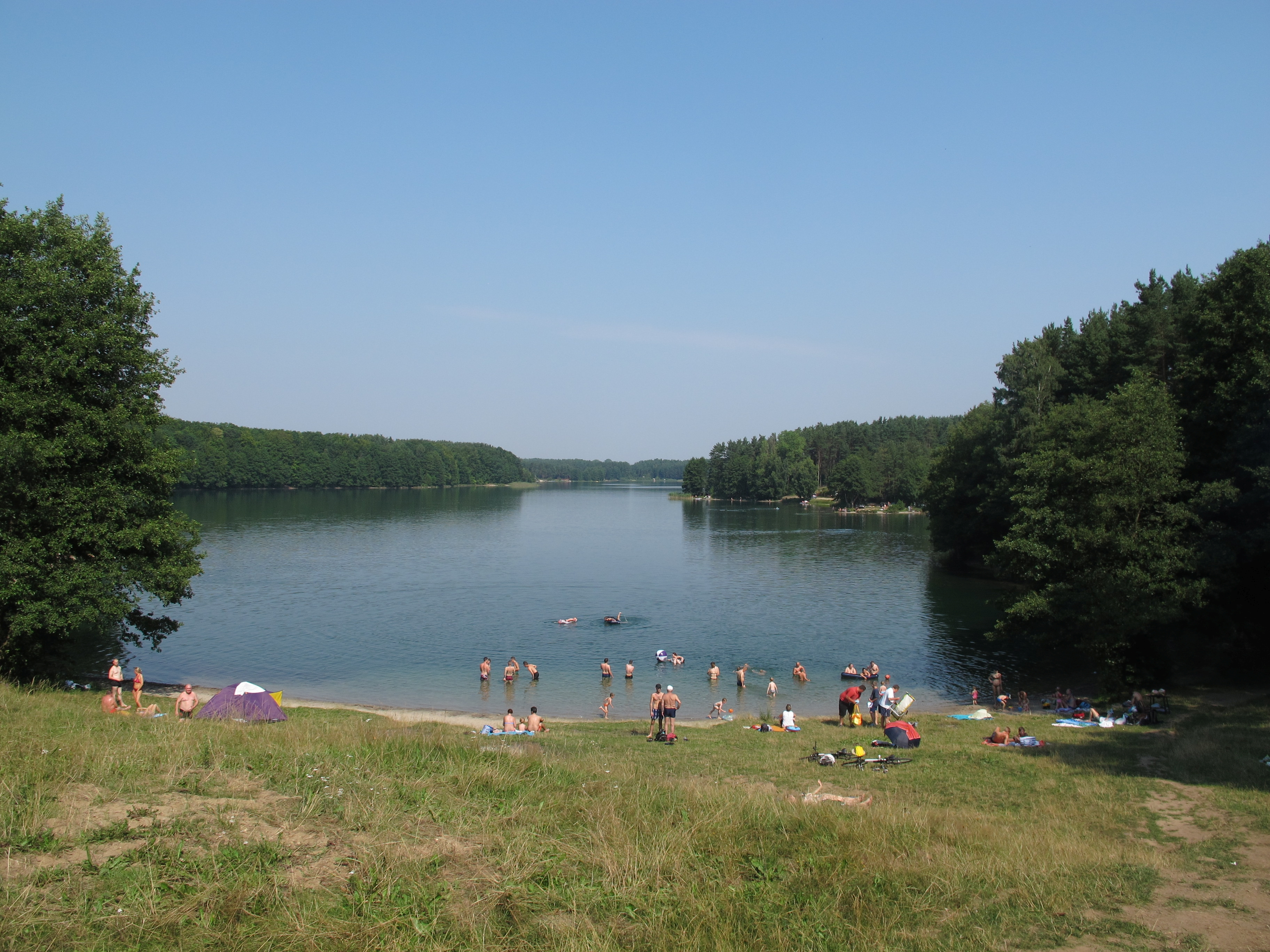

- Location within Poland
- Coordinates: 54°20′17″N 18°17′56″E
- Country: Poland
- Voivodeship: Pomeranian
- County: Kartuzy
- Gmina: Kartuzy
- Population: 229

Sitno [ˈɕitnɔ] (Cashubian Sëtno) is a village in the administrative district of Gmina Kartuzy, within Kartuzy County, Pomeranian Voivodeship, in northern Poland.

For details of the history of the region, see History of Pomerania.
