= Sianowska Huta =

- Village
- Location within Poland
- Coordinates: 54°23′27″N 18°8′16″E
- Country: Poland
- Voivodeship: Pomeranian
- County: Kartuzy
- Gmina: Kartuzy
- Population: 351

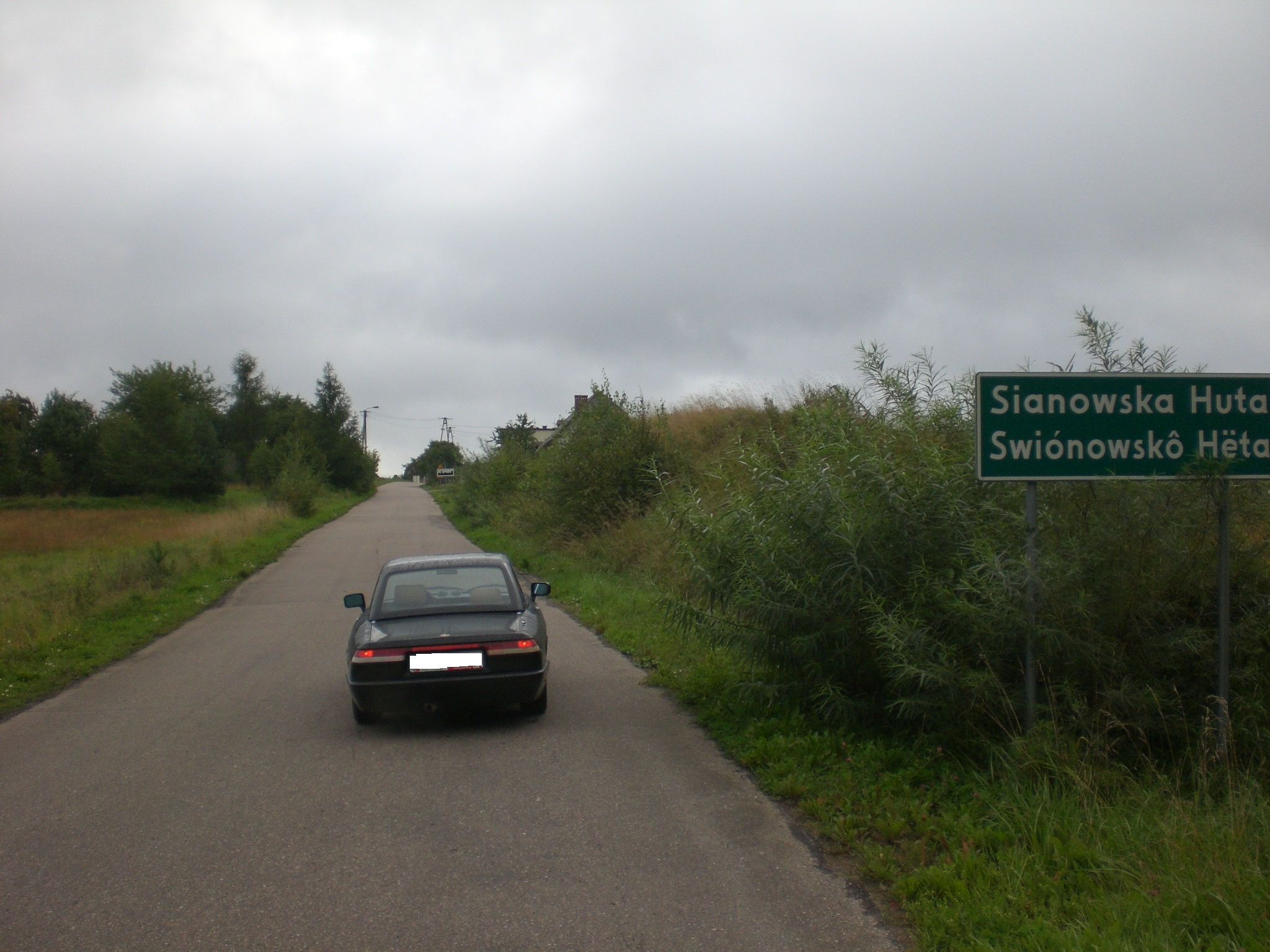
Sianowska Huta in Polish and Cashubian

Sianowska Huta [ɕaˈnɔfska ˈxuta] (Cashubian Swiónowskô Hëta) is a village in the administrative district of Gmina Kartuzy, within Kartuzy County, Pomeranian Voivodeship, in northern Poland.

For details of the history of the region, see History of Pomerania.
