= Bukowa Góra, Gmina Kartuzy =

Bukowa Góra Bùkòwô Góra
- Settlement
- Location within Poland
- Coordinates: 54°25′05″N 18°03′51″E
- Country: Poland
- Voivodeship: Pomeranian
- County: Kartuzy
- Gmina: Kartuzy

Bukowa Góra [buˈkɔva ˈɡura] (Kashubian: Bùkòwô Góra) is a settlement in the administrative district of Gmina Kartuzy, within Kartuzy County, Pomeranian Voivodeship, in northern Poland.

For details of the history of the region, see History of Pomerania.
