= Grzebieniec, Pomeranian Voivodeship =

Grzebieniec
- Settlement
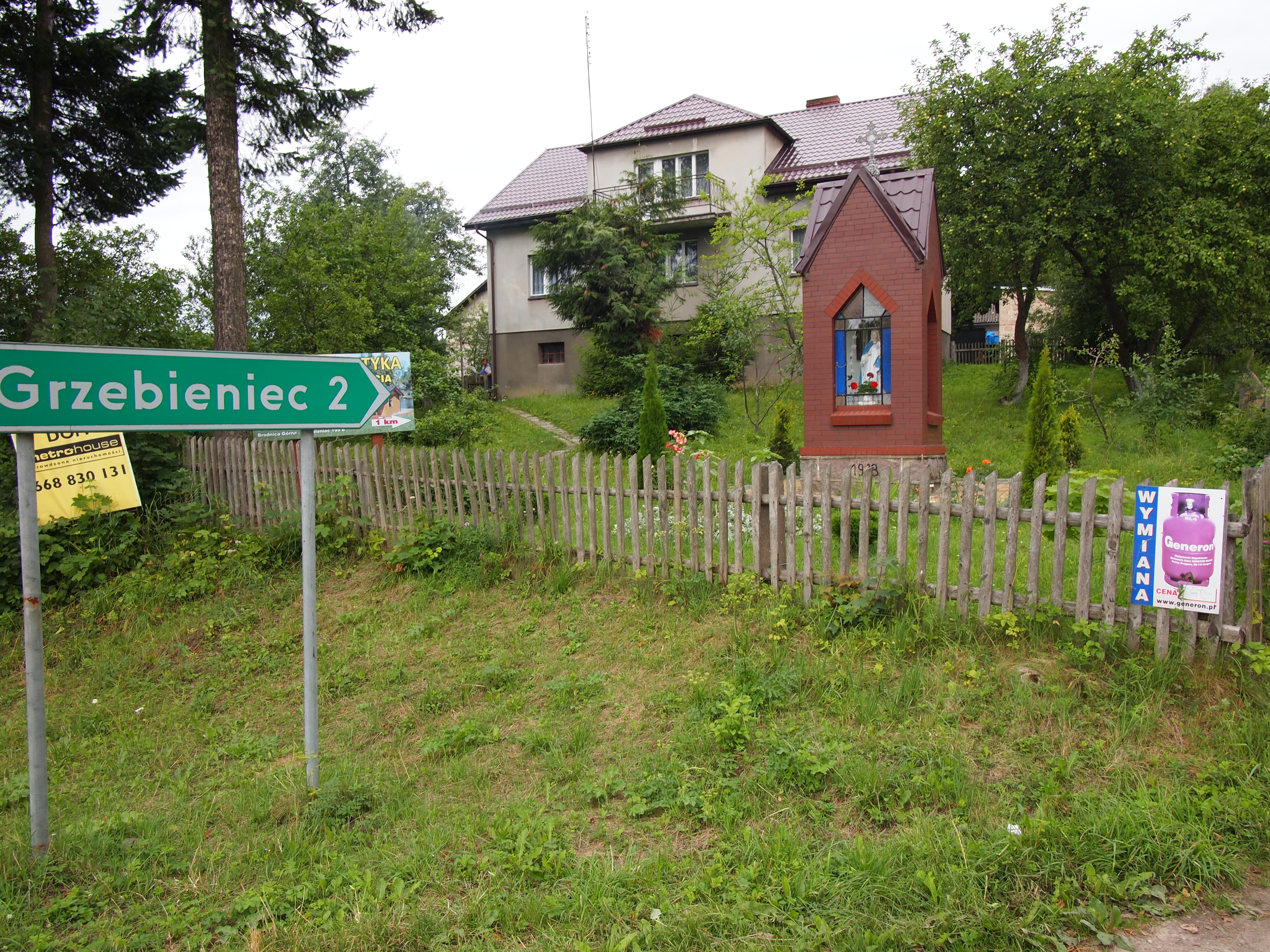

- Location within Poland
- Coordinates: 54°17′42″N 18°6′52″E
- Country: Poland
- Voivodeship: Pomeranian
- County: Kartuzy
- Gmina: Kartuzy

Grzebieniec [ɡʐɛˈbjɛɲɛt͡s] (Cashubian Grzebiéńcz, German: Grzebienitz) is a settlement in the administrative district of Gmina Kartuzy, within Kartuzy County, Pomeranian Voivodeship, in northern Poland.

For more details of the history of the region, see History of Pomerania.
