= Przytoki =

- Settlement
- Location within Poland
- Coordinates: 54°24′51″N 18°3′0″E
- Country: Poland
- Voivodeship: Pomeranian
- County: Kartuzy
- Gmina: Kartuzy

Przytoki [pʂɨˈtɔki] is a settlement in the administrative district of Gmina Kartuzy, within Kartuzy County, Pomeranian Voivodeship, in northern Poland.

For details of the history of the region, see History of Pomerania.
