= Burchardztwo =

- Neighbourhood of Kartuzy
- Location within Poland
- Coordinates: 54°19′17″N 18°13′0″E
- Country: Poland
- Voivodeship: Pomeranian
- County: Kartuzy
- Gmina: Kartuzy
- Town: Kartuzy

Population
  - Total: 212
- Time zone: UTC+1 (CET)
  - Summer (DST): UTC+2 (CEST)
- Vehicle registration: GKA

Burchardztwo [burˈxart͡stfɔ] (Kashubian: Bùrchardztwò) is a neighbourhood of the town of Kartuzy in Pomeranian Voivodeship, Poland.

It is a former possession of the monastery in Żukowo.
