= Olszowe Błoto =

- Settlement
- Location within Poland
- Coordinates: 54°22′54″N 18°0′17″E
- Country: Poland
- Voivodeship: Pomeranian
- County: Kartuzy
- Gmina: Kartuzy
- Population: 22

Olszowe Błoto [ɔlˈʂɔvɛ ˈbwɔtɔ] (Cashubian Òlszowé Błoto) is a settlement in the administrative district of Gmina Kartuzy, within Kartuzy County, Pomeranian Voivodeship, in northern Poland.

For details of the history of the region, see History of Pomerania.
