= Nowa Huta, Pomeranian Voivodeship =

Village in Kashubia

Nowa Huta Nowô Hëta
- Village
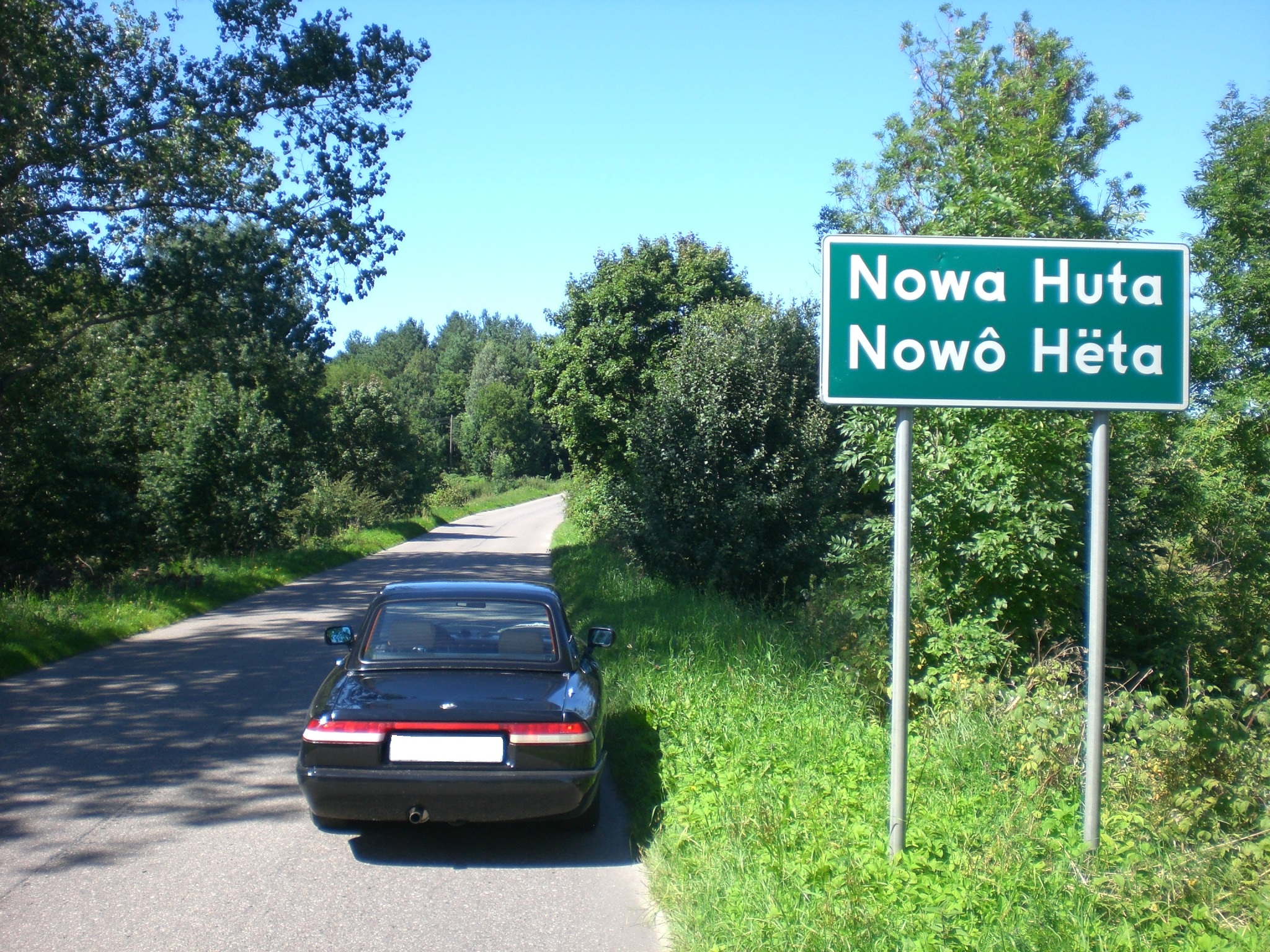
- A bilingual Polish-Cashubian road sign for the village

- Location within Poland
- Coordinates: 54°24′52″N 18°1′23″E
- Country: Poland
- Voivodeship: Pomeranian
- County: Kartuzy
- Gmina: Kartuzy
- Population: 282

Nowa Huta [ˈnɔva ˈxuta] (Kashubian: Nowô Hëta) is a village in the administrative district of Gmina Kartuzy, within Kartuzy County, Pomeranian Voivodeship, in northern Poland.

For details of the history of the region, see History of Pomerania.

== Notable residents ==
- Gerard Labuda (1916–2010), Polish historian
