= Gerard Labuda =

Polish historian

- Gerard Labùda
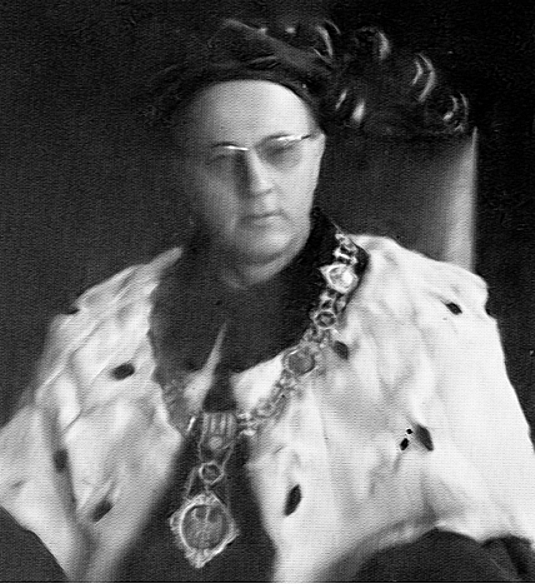
- Portrait of Labuda whilst rector of UAM, c. 1965
- Born: 28 December 1916; Neuhütte, Kreis Karthaus, West Prussia, German Empire
- Died: 1 October 2010 (aged 93); Poznań, Greater Poland, Third Polish Republic
- Spouse: Alberta Wielopolska
- Children: 5
- Parent(s): Stanisław and Anastazja (née Baranowska)

Academic background
- Education: Lund University
- Alma mater: University of the Western Lands
- Thesis: Założenia Arcybiskupstwa Magdeburskiego i Biskupstwa Poznańskiego na tle wschodniej polityki misyjnej (1944)
- Doctoral advisor: Kazimierz Tymieniecki
- Other advisor: Józef Kostrzewski

Academic work
- Discipline: History
- Notable students: Marceli Kosman; Jerzy Strzelczyk

Gerard Labuda (Kashubian: Gerard Labùda; 28 December 1916 – 1 October 2010) was a Polish historian whose main fields of interest were the Middle Ages and the Western Slavs. He was born in Kashubia. He lived and died in Poznań, Poland.

== Life ==
Labuda was born in Neuhütte, German Empire (presently; Nowa Huta, Poland), into a Kashubian family. He was the son of Stanisław Labuda and Anastazja Baranowska. From 1950 he was a professor at Poznań University (UAM after 1955); rector 1962–1965; from 1951 a member of the Polish Academy of Learning; president 1989–1994; from 1964 member of the Polish Academy of Sciences; vice-president 1984–1989; from 1959 to 1961 director of the Western Institute in Poznań and a member of the New York Academy of Sciences. He was buried in Luzino, Kashubia.

From 1958 onwards, he edited the multi-volume Słownik Starożytności Słowiańskich (transl. Dictionary of Slavonic Antiquities) and published historical sources. Author of more than 30 books and close to 2000 scholarly publications.

Awarded the Grand Cross of the Order of Polonia Restituta (1996) and the highest Polish distinction Order of the White Eagle (2010; posthumously).

Award of the Alfred Jurzykowski Foundation (USA, 1983), Herder Award (Austria, 1991). State of Poland awards (1949, 1951, 1970).

Honorary Doctorates of Gdańsk University (1986), Nicolas Copernicus University (1993), Jagiellonian University (1995), Warsaw University (1997), Wrocław University (1999) and Szczecin University (2003).

== Works ==
- Studia nad początkami państwa polskiego (Studies of the early Polish statehood), Kraków 1946.
- Pierwsze państwo słowiańskie - państwo Samona (The first Slavonic state - Samon's state), Poznań 1949.
- Fragmenty dziejów Słowiańszczyzny Zachodniej (Fragments of the History of Western Slavdom), vols. 1–2, 1960–64.
- Polska granica zachodnia. Tysiąc lat dziejów politycznych (Poland's Western Border: a Thousand Years of Political History), 1971.
- Pierwsze państwo polskie (The first Polish state), Kraków 1989.
- O Kaszubach, ich nazwie i ziemi zamieszkania (Kashubian People, their name and land), Gdynia 1991.
- Kaszubi i ich dzieje (Kashubians and their history), 1996, ISBN 83-904950-9-0
- Św. Stanisław Biskup krakowski, Patron Polski (Stanislas Bishop of Kraków, Patron Saint of Poland), Poznań 2000.
- Mieszko I, Wrocław 2002.
- Słowiańszczyzna starożytna i wczesnośredniowieczna (Slavdom in antiquity and early middle ages), 2003.
- Historia Kaszubów w dziejach Pomorza (The history of Kashubians within history of Pomerania) t.1 Czasy średniowieczne (vol.1 Middle ages), Gdańsk 2006.
