= Ucisko =

- Village
- Location within Poland
- Coordinates: 54°22′46″N 18°11′42″E
- Country: Poland
- Voivodeship: Pomeranian
- County: Kartuzy
- Gmina: Kartuzy

Ucisko [uˈt͡ɕiskɔ] (Cashubian Ùcësk) is a village in the administrative district of Gmina Kartuzy, within Kartuzy County, Pomeranian Voivodeship, in northern Poland.

For details of the history of the region, see History of Pomerania.
