= Szklana Huta, Kartuzy County =

Szklana Huta Fabrika
- Settlement
- Location within Poland
- Coordinates: 54°17′40″N 18°5′16″E
- Country: Poland
- Voivodeship: Pomeranian
- County: Kartuzy
- Gmina: Kartuzy

Szklana Huta [ˈʂklana ˈxuta] (Kashubian: Fabrika) is a settlement in the administrative district of Gmina Kartuzy, within Kartuzy County, Pomeranian Voivodeship, in northern Poland.

For details of the history of the region, see History of Pomerania.
