= Stara Huta, Gmina Kartuzy =

Village in Kashubia

Stara Huta Stôrô Hëta
- Village
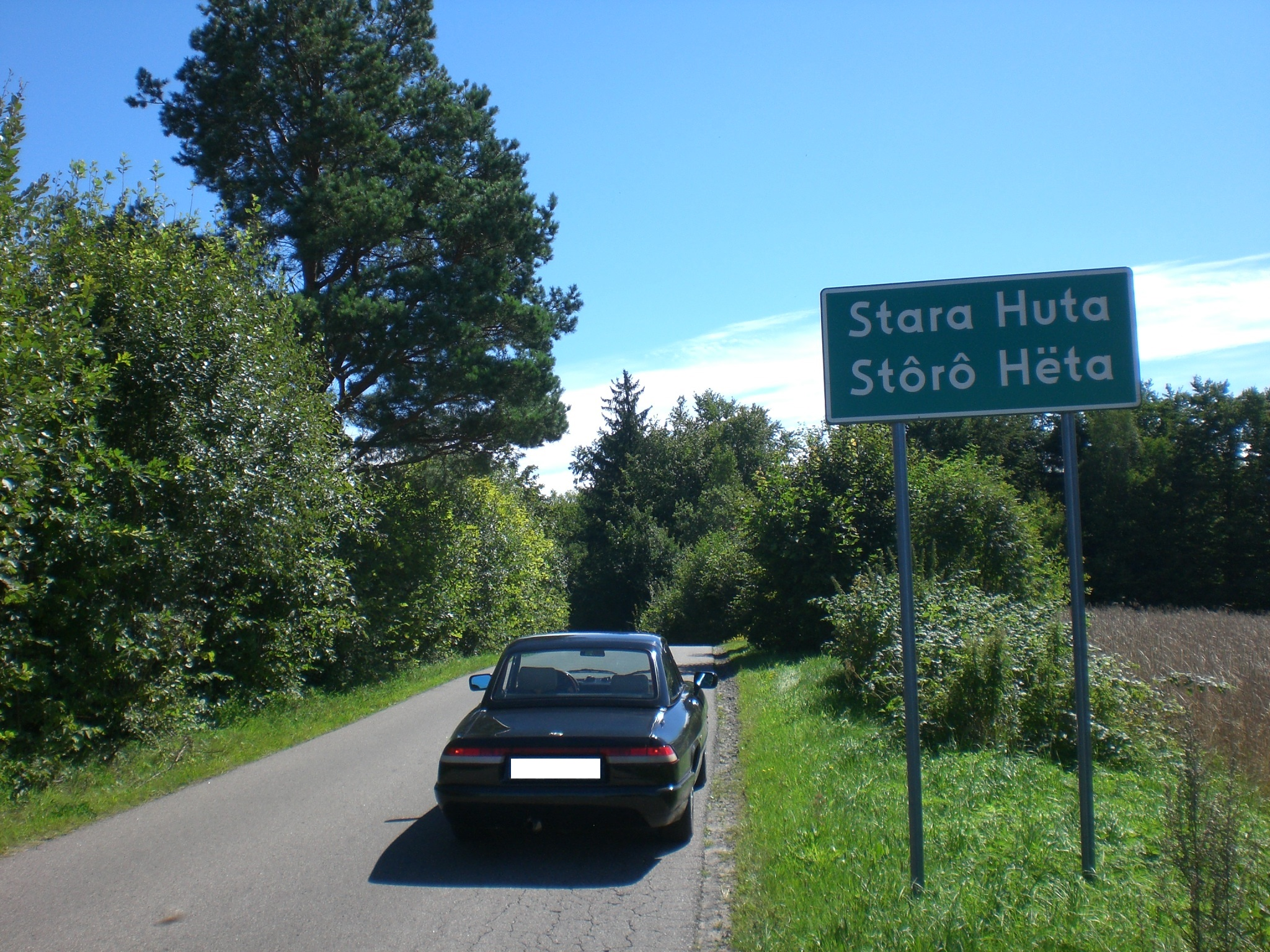
- A bilingual Polish-Kashubian road sign for the village

- Location within Poland
- Coordinates: 54°25′25″N 18°2′59″E
- Country: Poland
- Voivodeship: Pomeranian
- County: Kartuzy
- Gmina: Kartuzy
- Population: 243

Stara Huta [ˈstara ˈxuta] (Kashubian: Stôrô Hëta) is a village in the administrative district of Gmina Kartuzy, within Kartuzy County, Pomeranian Voivodeship, in northern Poland.

For details of the history of the region, see History of Pomerania.
