= Staniszewo, Pomeranian Voivodeship =

Staniszewo
- Village
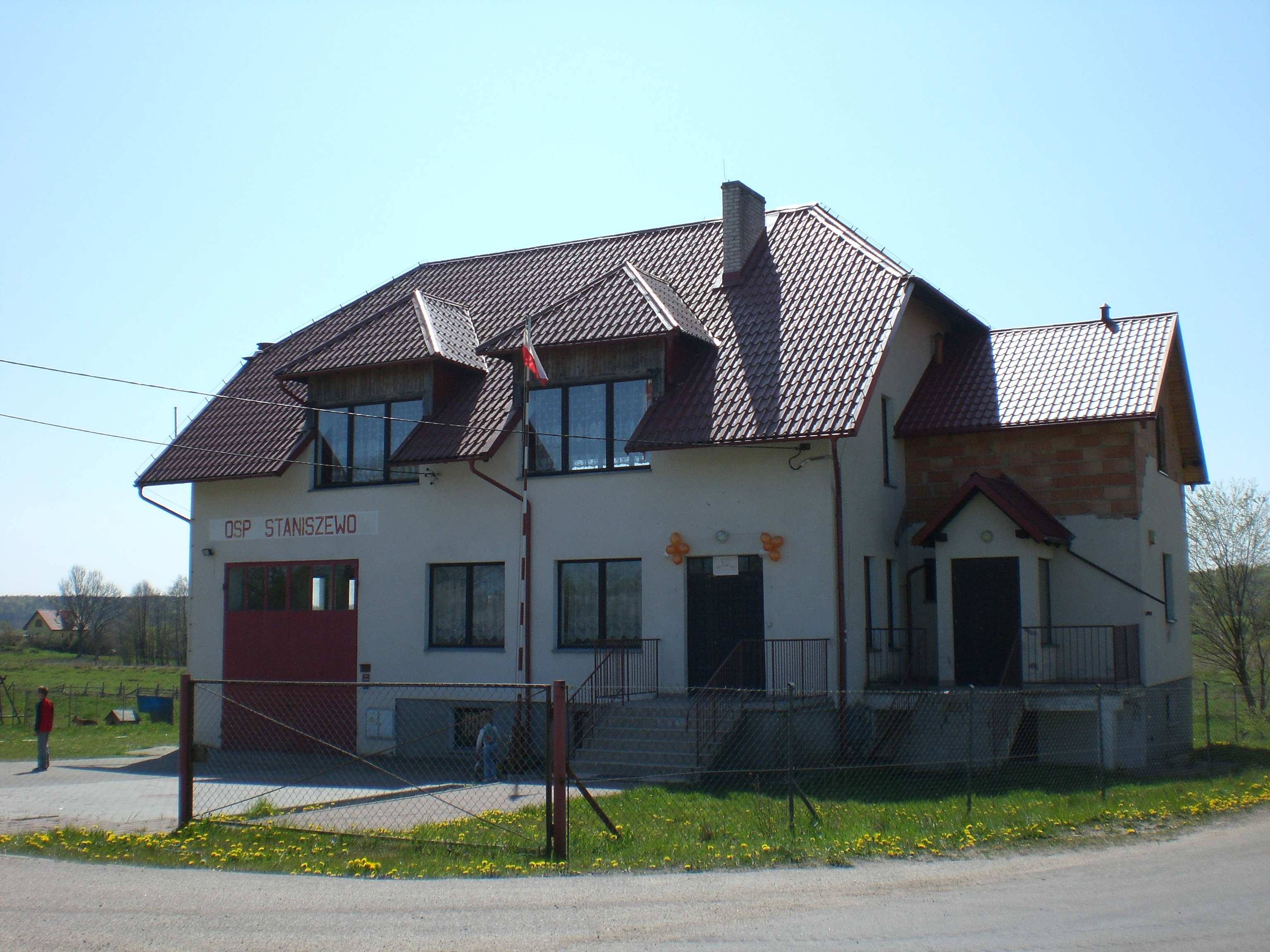

- Location within Poland
- Coordinates: 54°23′44″N 18°4′35″E
- Country: Poland
- Voivodeship: Pomeranian
- County: Kartuzy
- Gmina: Kartuzy
- Population: 915

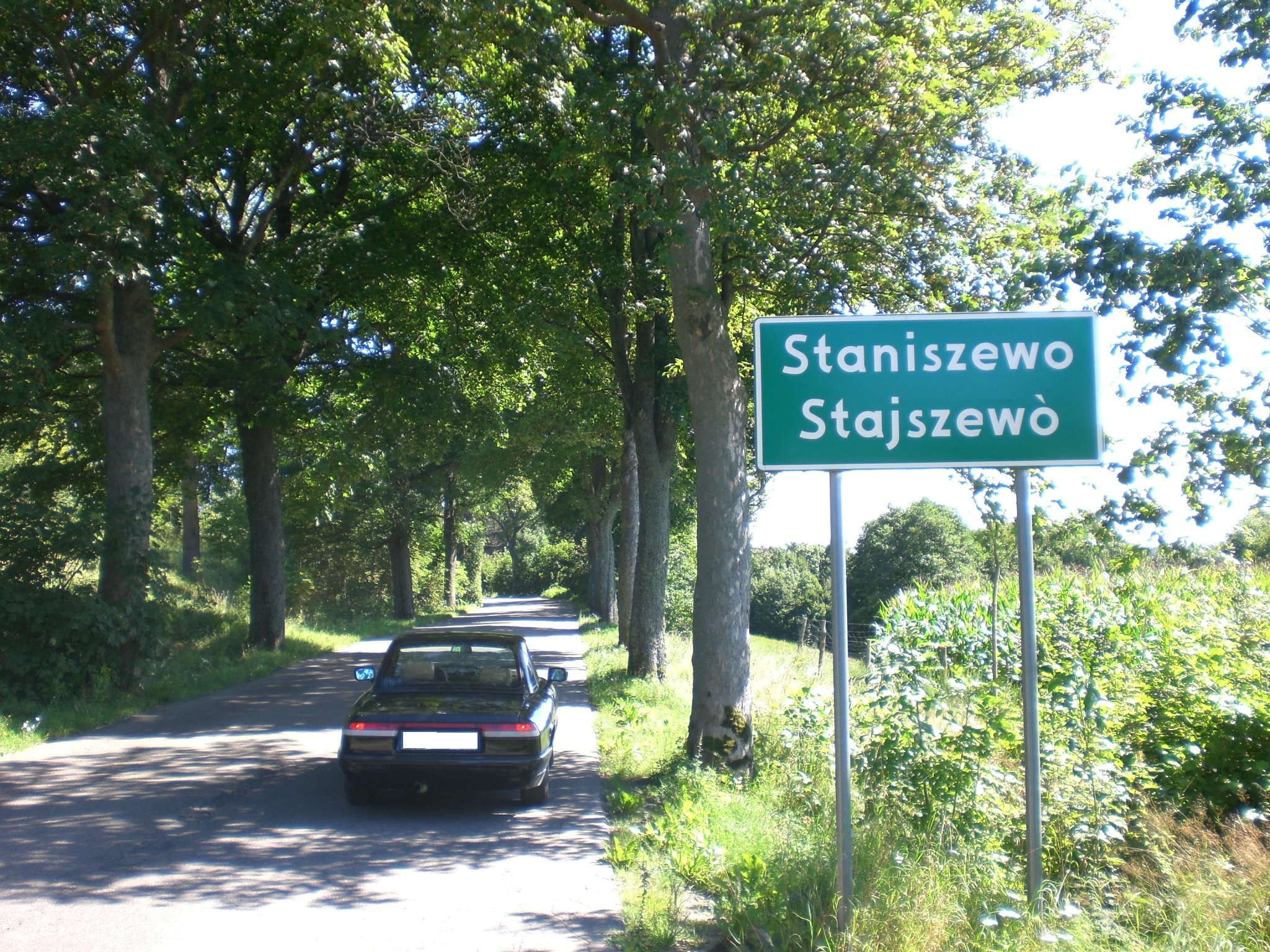
Staniszewo in Polish and Kashubian

Staniszewo [staniˈʂɛvɔ] (Cashubian Stajszewò) is a village in the administrative district of Gmina Kartuzy, within Kartuzy County, Pomeranian Voivodeship, in northern Poland. There is a school in Staniszewo. Students learn three languages - English, German and Kashubian.

For details of the history of the region, see History of Pomerania.
