= Bylowo-Leśnictwo =

- Settlement
- Location within Poland
- Coordinates: 54°20′23″N 18°10′25″E
- Country: Poland
- Voivodeship: Pomeranian
- County: Kartuzy
- Gmina: Kartuzy

Bylowo-Leśnictwo [bɨˈlɔvɔ lɛɕˈnit͡stfɔ] (Cashubian Bëlowò) is a settlement in the administrative district of Gmina Kartuzy, within Kartuzy County, Pomeranian Voivodeship, in northern Poland.

For details of the history of the region, see History of Pomerania.
