= Nowiny, Kartuzy County =

Nowiny
- Village
- Location within Poland
- Coordinates: 54°22′38″N 18°9′6″E
- Country: Poland
- Voivodeship: Pomeranian
- County: Kartuzy
- Gmina: Kartuzy

Nowiny [nɔˈvinɨ] is a village in the administrative district of Gmina Kartuzy, within Kartuzy County, Pomeranian Voivodeship, in northern Poland.

For details of the history of the region, see History of Pomerania.
