= Gmina Kartuzy =

Gmina Kartuzy Kartuzy Commune
- Gmina
- Coat of arms
- Interactive map of Gmina Kartuzy
- Coordinates (Kartuzy): 54°20′N 18°12′E
- Country: Poland
- Voivodeship: Pomeranian
- County: Kartuzy
- Seat: Kartuzy

Area
  - Total: 205.28 km^{2} (79.26 sq mi)

Population (2006)
  - Total: 31,100
  - Density: 152/km^{2} (392/sq mi)
  - Urban: 15,263
  - Rural: 15,837
- Website: http://www.kartuzy.pl/

Gmina Kartuzy is an urban-rural gmina (administrative district) in Kartuzy County, Pomeranian Voivodeship, in northern Poland. Its seat is the town of Kartuzy, which lies approximately 29 kilometres (18 mi) west of the regional capital Gdańsk.

The gmina covers an area of 205.28 square kilometres (79.3 sq mi), and as of 2006 its total population is 31,100 (out of which the population of Kartuzy amounts to 15,263, and the population of the rural part of the gmina is 15,837).

The gmina contains part of the protected area called Kashubian Landscape Park.

== Villages ==
Apart from the town of Kartuzy, Gmina Kartuzy contains the villages and settlements of:

- Bącz
- Bernardówka
- Bór-Okola
- Borowiec
- Borowo
- Brodnica Dolna
- Brodnica Górna
- Bukowa Góra
- Burchardztwo
- Bylowo-Leśnictwo
- Chojna
- Cieszonko
- Dzierżążno
- Dzierżążno-Leśnictwo
- Głusino
- Grzebieniec
- Grzybno
- Grzybno Górne
- Kaliska
- Kalka
- Kamienna Góra
- Kamionka
- Kamionka Brodnicka
- Kępa
- Kiełpino
- Kolonia
- Kosy
- Kozłowy Staw
- Krzewino
- Łapalice
- Lesińce
- Leszno
- Melgrowa Góra
- Mezowo
- Mirachowo
- Młyńsko
- Mokre Łąki
- Nowa Huta
- Nowinki
- Nowiny
- Olszowe Błoto
- Ostowo
- Pieczyska
- Pikarnia
- Pomieczyńska Huta
- Prokowo
- Prokowskie Chrósty
- Przybród
- Przytoki
- Raj
- Ręboszewo
- Sarnówko
- Sarnowo
- Sianowo
- Sianowo Leśne
- Sianowska Huta
- Sitno
- Smętowo Chmieleńskie
- Smętowo Leśne
- Smolne Błoto
- Staniszewo
- Stara Huta
- Stążki
- Strysza Buda
- Sytna Góra
- Szade Góry
- Szklana Huta
- Szotowo
- Ucisko
- Złota Góra

== Neighbouring gminas ==
Gmina Kartuzy is bordered by the gminas of Chmielno, Linia, Przodkowo, Sierakowice, Somonino, Stężyca, Szemud and Żukowo.
