= Mezowo =

Mezowo Mézowò
- Village
- Location within Poland
- Coordinates: 54°18′N 18°14′E
- Country: Poland
- Voivodeship: Pomeranian
- County: Kartuzy
- Gmina: Kartuzy
- Population: 544
- Website: http://www.mezowo.pl/

Mezowo [mɛˈzɔvɔ] (Kashubian: Mézowò) is a village in the administrative district of Gmina Kartuzy, within Kartuzy County, Pomeranian Voivodeship, in northern Poland.

For details of the history of the region, see History of Pomerania.
