= Sytna Góra =

- Village
- Location within Poland
- Coordinates: 54°22′39″N 18°10′50″E
- Country: Poland
- Voivodeship: Pomeranian
- County: Kartuzy
- Gmina: Kartuzy
- Population: 62

Sytna Góra [ˈsɨtna ˈɡura] is a village in the administrative district of Gmina Kartuzy, within Kartuzy County, Pomeranian Voivodeship, in northern Poland.

For details of the history of the region, see History of Pomerania.
