= Pomieczyńska Huta =

- Village
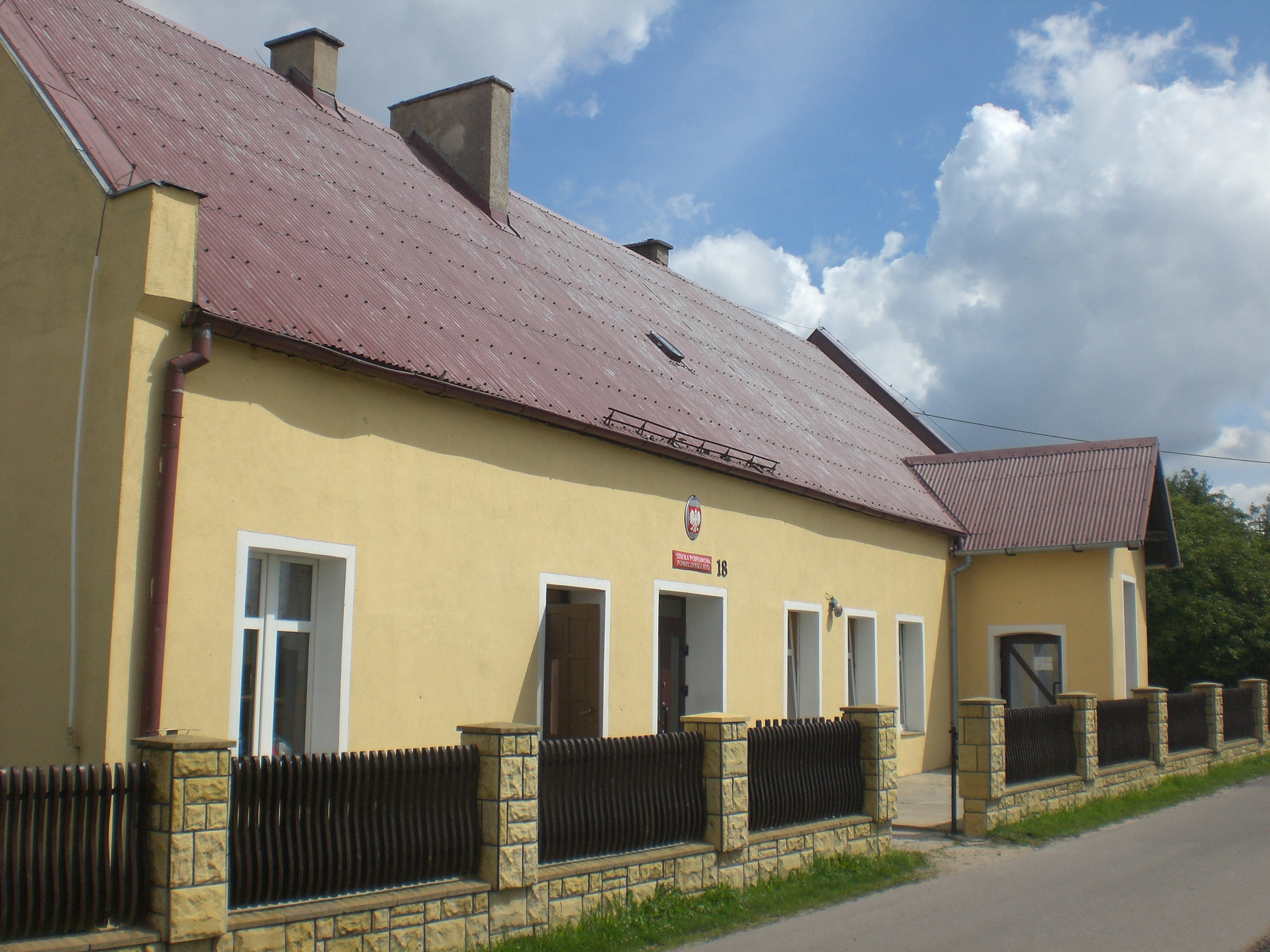
- Elementary school in Pomieczyńska Huta

- Location within Poland
- Coordinates: 54°23′19″N 18°10′3″E
- Country: Poland
- Voivodeship: Pomeranian
- County: Kartuzy
- Gmina: Kartuzy
- Elevation: 246 m (807 ft)
- Population: 478
- Time zone: UTC+1 (CET)
  - Summer (DST): UTC+2 (CEST)
- Vehicle registration: GKA

Pomieczyńska Huta [pɔmjɛˈt͡ʂɨɲska ˈxuta] (Cashubian Pòmieczińskô Hëta) is a village in the administrative district of Gmina Kartuzy, within Kartuzy County, Pomeranian Voivodeship, in northern Poland. It is located in the ethnocultural region of Kashubia in the historic region of Pomerania.

== History ==
During the German occupation of Poland (World War II), Pomieczyńska Huta was one of the sites of executions of Poles, carried out by the Germans in 1939 as part of the Intelligenzaktion. In 1942, the occupiers also carried out expulsions of Poles, who were deported to the Potulice concentration camp, while their houses were handed over to new German colonists as part of the Lebensraum policy.
