= Bącz =

- Village
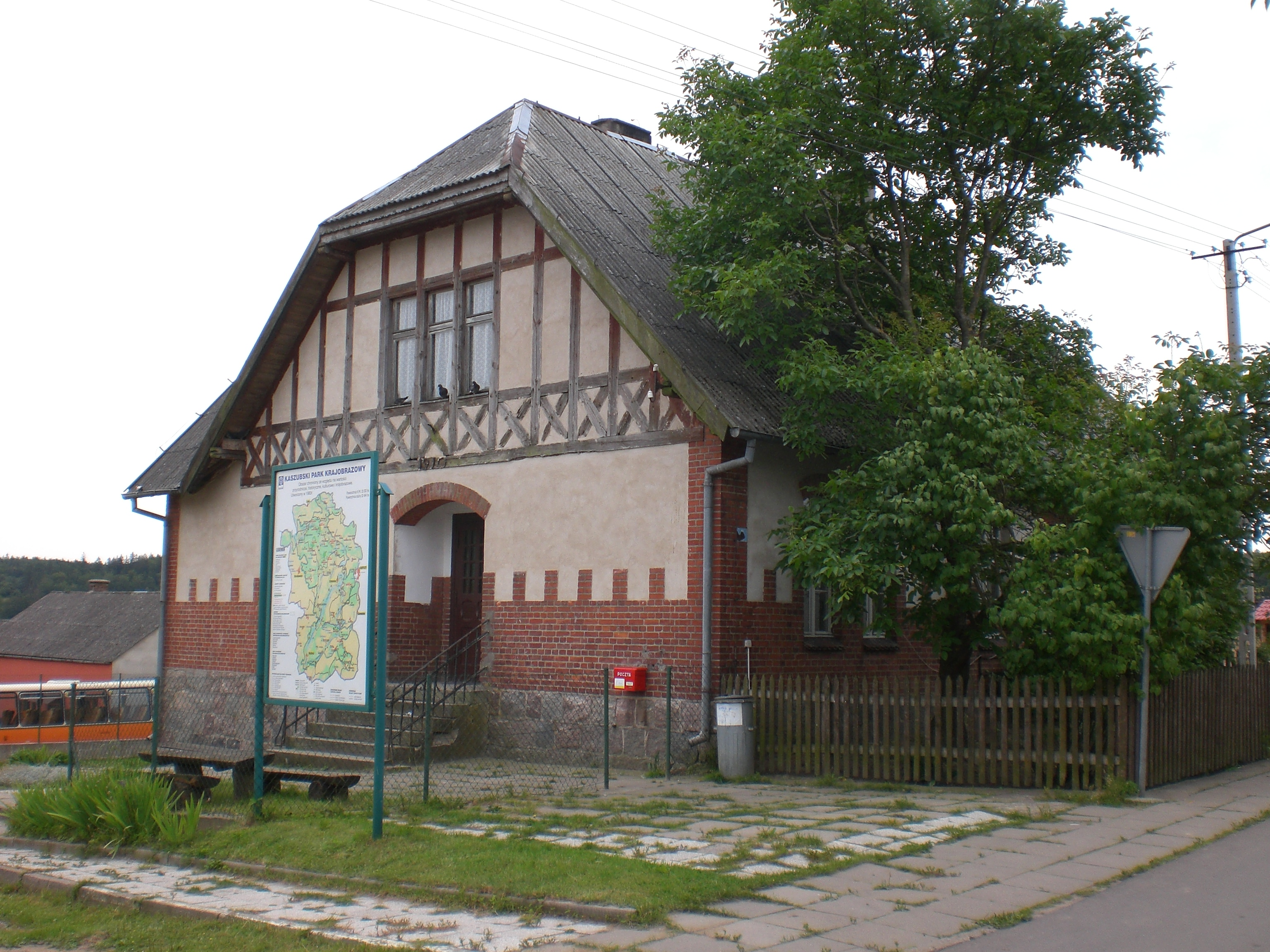

- Location within Poland
- Coordinates: 54°22′48″N 17°59′30″E
- Country: Poland
- Voivodeship: Pomeranian
- County: Kartuzy
- Gmina: Kartuzy
- Population: 268

Bącz [bɔnt͡ʂ] (Cashubian Bącz) is a village in the administrative district of Gmina Kartuzy, within Kartuzy County, Pomeranian Voivodeship, in northern Poland.

For details of the history of the region, see History of Pomerania.

Józef Kos was born in the village.
