= Młyńsko, Pomeranian Voivodeship =

Młyńsko
- Settlement
- Location within Poland
- Coordinates: 54°22′45″N 18°6′0″E
- Country: Poland
- Voivodeship: Pomeranian
- County: Kartuzy
- Gmina: Kartuzy

Młyńsko [ˈmwɨɲskɔ] is a settlement in the administrative district of Gmina Kartuzy, within Kartuzy County, Pomeranian Voivodeship, in northern Poland.

For details of the history of the region, see History of Pomerania.
