= Brodnica Dolna =

- Village
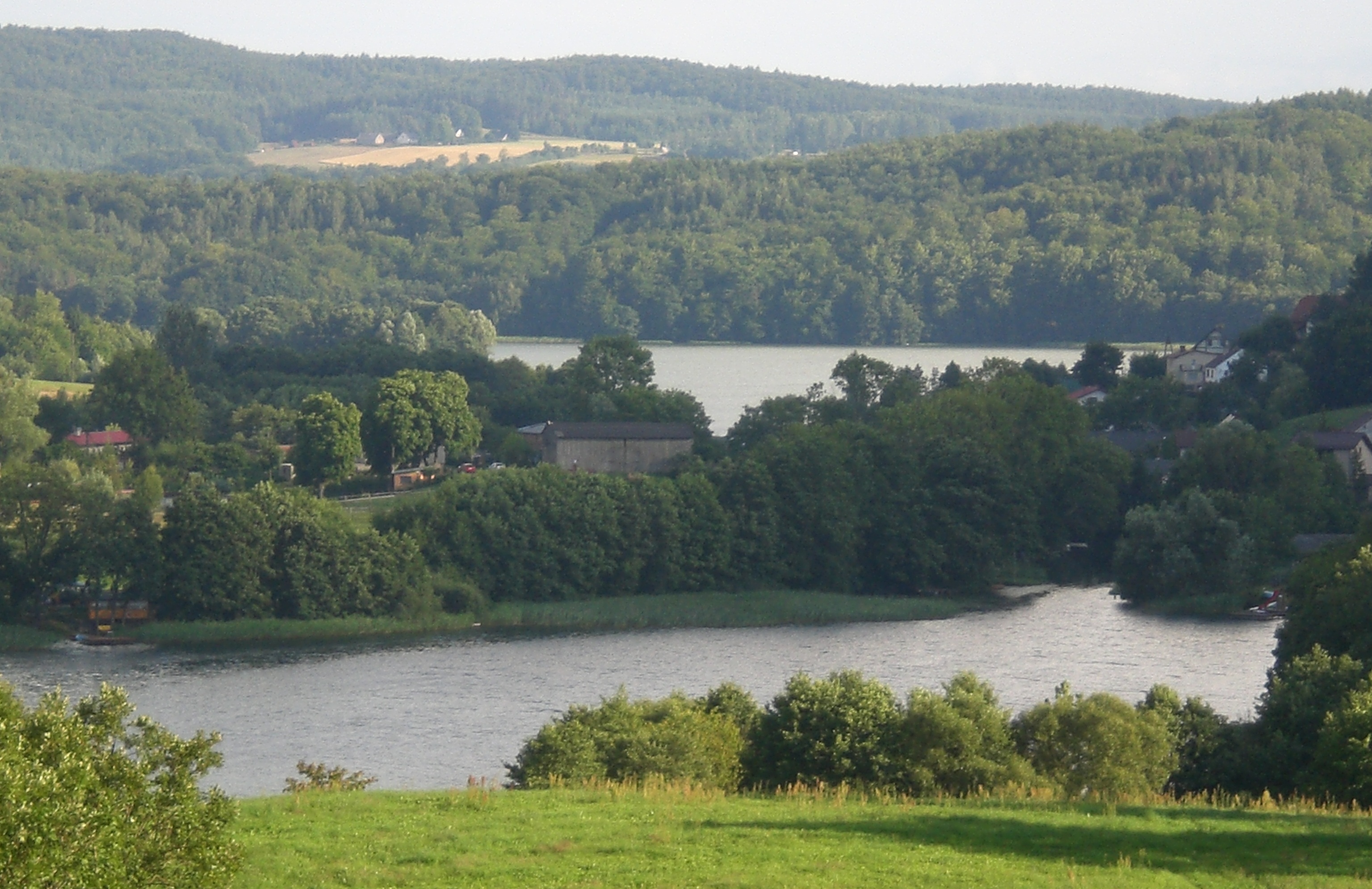

- Location within Poland
- Coordinates: 54°15′47″N 18°5′56″E
- Country: Poland
- Voivodeship: Pomeranian
- County: Kartuzy
- Gmina: Kartuzy
- Population: 359

Brodnica Dolna [brɔdˈnit͡sa ˈdɔlna] (Cashubian Dólnô Brodnica) is a village in the administrative district of Gmina Kartuzy, within Kartuzy County, Pomeranian Voivodeship, in northern Poland.

For details of the history of the region, see History of Pomerania.
