= Kaliska, Kartuzy County =

Kaliska Kalëska
- Village
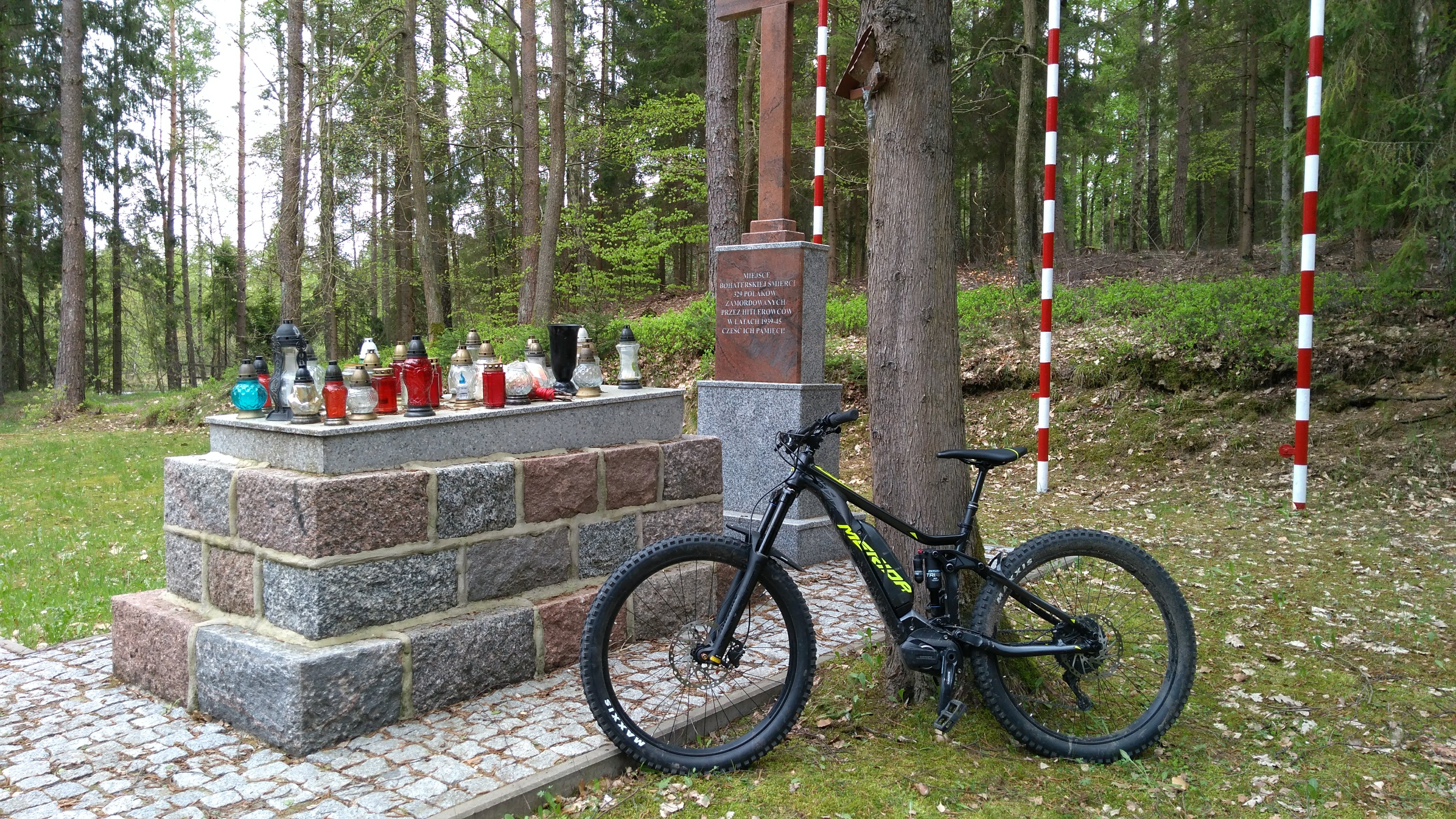
- Memorial at the site of German massacres of Poles carried out in 1939

- Location within Poland
- Coordinates: 54°20′10″N 18°13′59″E
- Country: Poland
- Voivodeship: Pomeranian
- County: Kartuzy
- Gmina: Kartuzy
- Population: 220
- Time zone: UTC+1 (CET)
  - Summer (DST): UTC+2 (CEST)
- Vehicle registration: GKA

Kaliska [kaˈliska] (Kashubian: Kalëska) is a village in the administrative district of Gmina Kartuzy, within Kartuzy County, Pomeranian Voivodeship, in northern Poland. It is located within the ethnocultural region of Kashubia in the historic region of Pomerania.

During the German occupation of Poland (World War II), the Kaliska forest was the site of large massacres of Poles, carried out by the Germans from September to November 1939 as part of the Intelligenzaktion. Among the victims were Polish teachers, policemen, activists, local officials, dentists, postal workers, foresters, priests, and other inhabitants from Kartuzy, Żukowo and various nearby villages.
