= Prokowo =

- Village
- Location within Poland
- Coordinates: 54°21′32″N 18°9′59″E
- Country: Poland
- Voivodeship: Pomeranian
- County: Kartuzy
- Gmina: Kartuzy
- Population: 1,500

Prokowo [prɔˈkɔvɔ] (Cashubian Prokòwò) is a big village in the administrative district of Gmina Kartuzy, within Kartuzy County, Pomeranian Voivodeship, in northern Poland.

For details of the history of the region, see History of Pomerania.
