= Smętowo Chmieleńskie =

- Village
- Location within Poland
- Coordinates: 54°18′13″N 18°8′57″E
- Country: Poland
- Voivodeship: Pomeranian
- County: Kartuzy
- Gmina: Kartuzy
- Population: 110

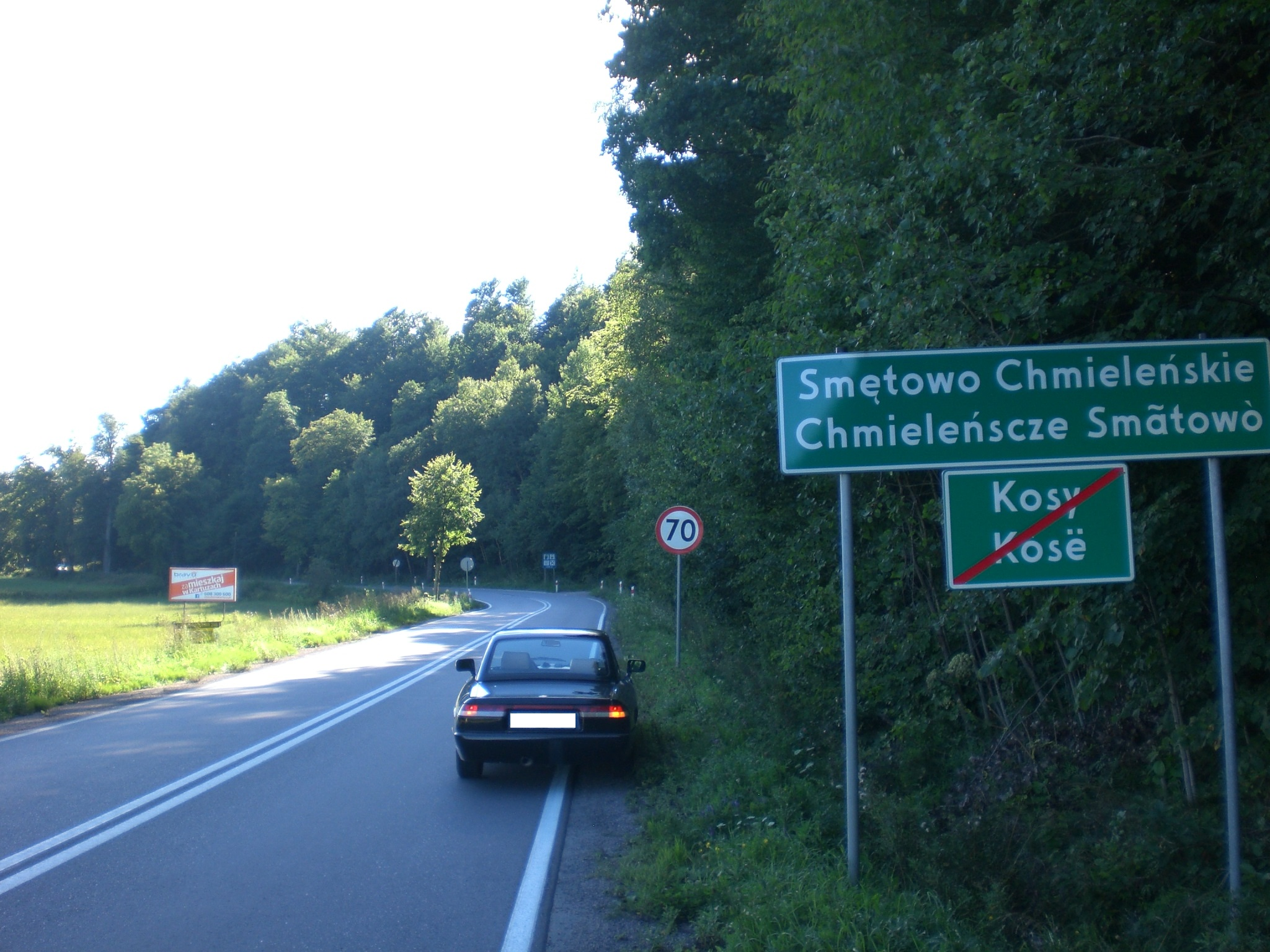
Smętowo Chmieleńskie in Polish and Cashubian

Smętowo Chmieleńskie [smɛnˈtɔvɔ xmjɛˈlɛɲskʲɛ] (Cashubian Chmieleńsczé Smãtowò) is a village in the administrative district of Gmina Kartuzy, within Kartuzy County, Pomeranian Voivodeship, in northern Poland.

For details of the history of the region, see History of Pomerania.
