= Gmina Brodnica =

Gmina Brodnica may refer to either of the following rural administrative districts in Poland:

- Gmina Brodnica, Kuyavian-Pomeranian Voivodeship
- Gmina Brodnica, Greater Poland Voivodeship
