= Stążki, Kartuzy County =

Stążki
- Village
- Location within Poland
- Coordinates: 54°25′33″N 18°6′4″E
- Country: Poland
- Voivodeship: Pomeranian
- County: Kartuzy
- Gmina: Kartuzy
- Population: 84

Stążki [ˈstɔ̃ʂki] (Cashubian Stążczi) is a village in the administrative district of Gmina Kartuzy, within Kartuzy County, Pomeranian Voivodeship, in northern Poland.

For details of the history of the region, see History of Pomerania.
