= Brodnica Górna =

- Village
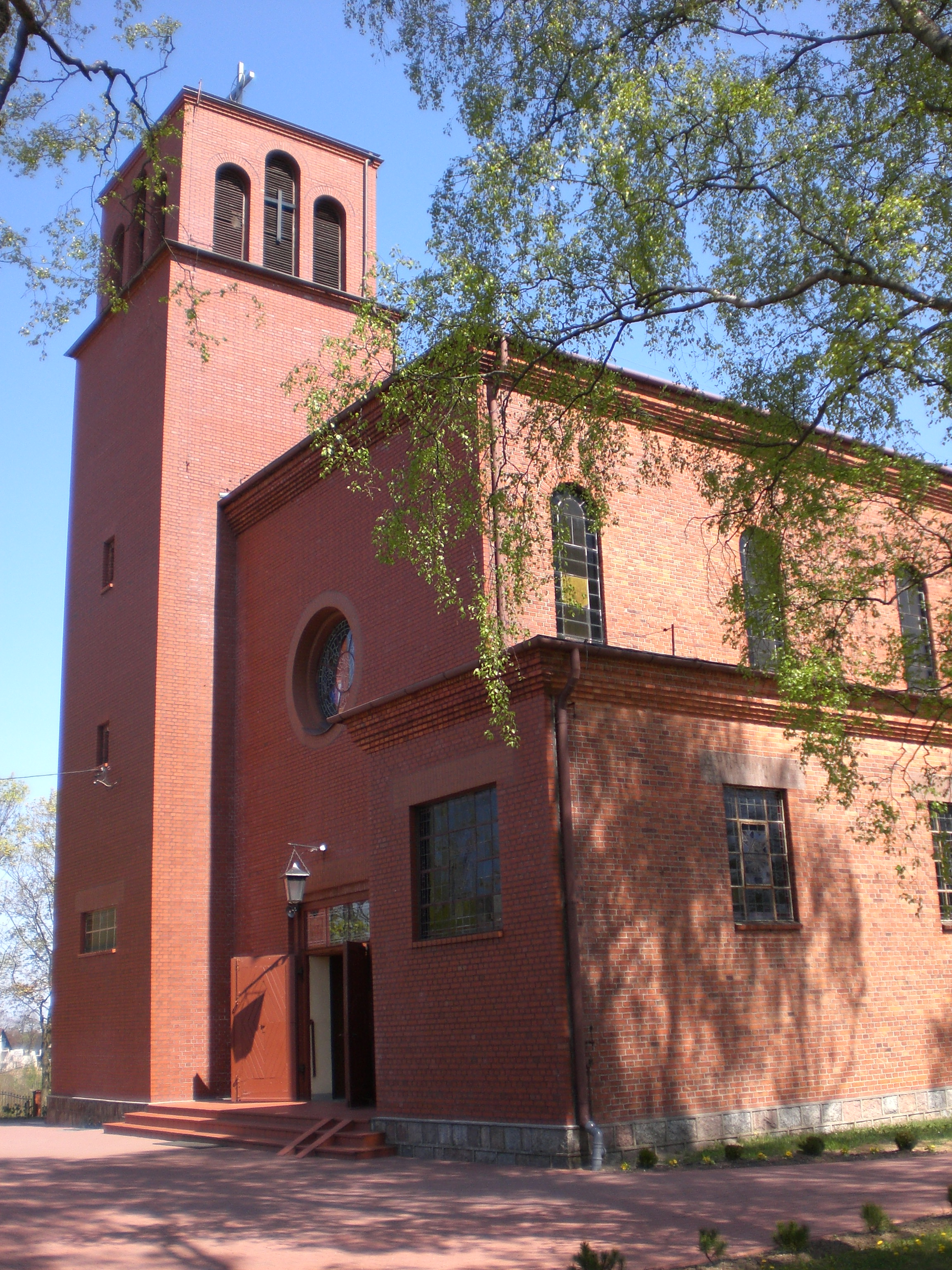
- Sacred Heart church in Brodnica Górna

- Location within Poland
- Coordinates: 54°16′12″N 18°4′56″E
- Country: Poland
- Voivodeship: Pomeranian
- County: Kartuzy
- Gmina: Kartuzy
- Population: 1,156
- Time zone: UTC+1 (CET)
  - Summer (DST): UTC+2 (CEST)
- Vehicle registration: GKA

Brodnica Górna [brɔdˈnit͡sa ˈɡurna] (Cashubian Górnô Brodnica) is a village in the administrative district of Gmina Kartuzy, within Kartuzy County, Pomeranian Voivodeship, in northern Poland. It is located within the ethnocultural region of Kashubia in the historic region of Pomerania.

During the German occupation of Poland (World War II), in September 1939, local priest Bernard Szutta was among 10 Polish priests murdered by the German Einsatzkommando 16 in the forest near Kartuzy (see Nazi crimes against the Polish nation).
