= Chojna, Gmina Kartuzy =

Chojna
- Settlement
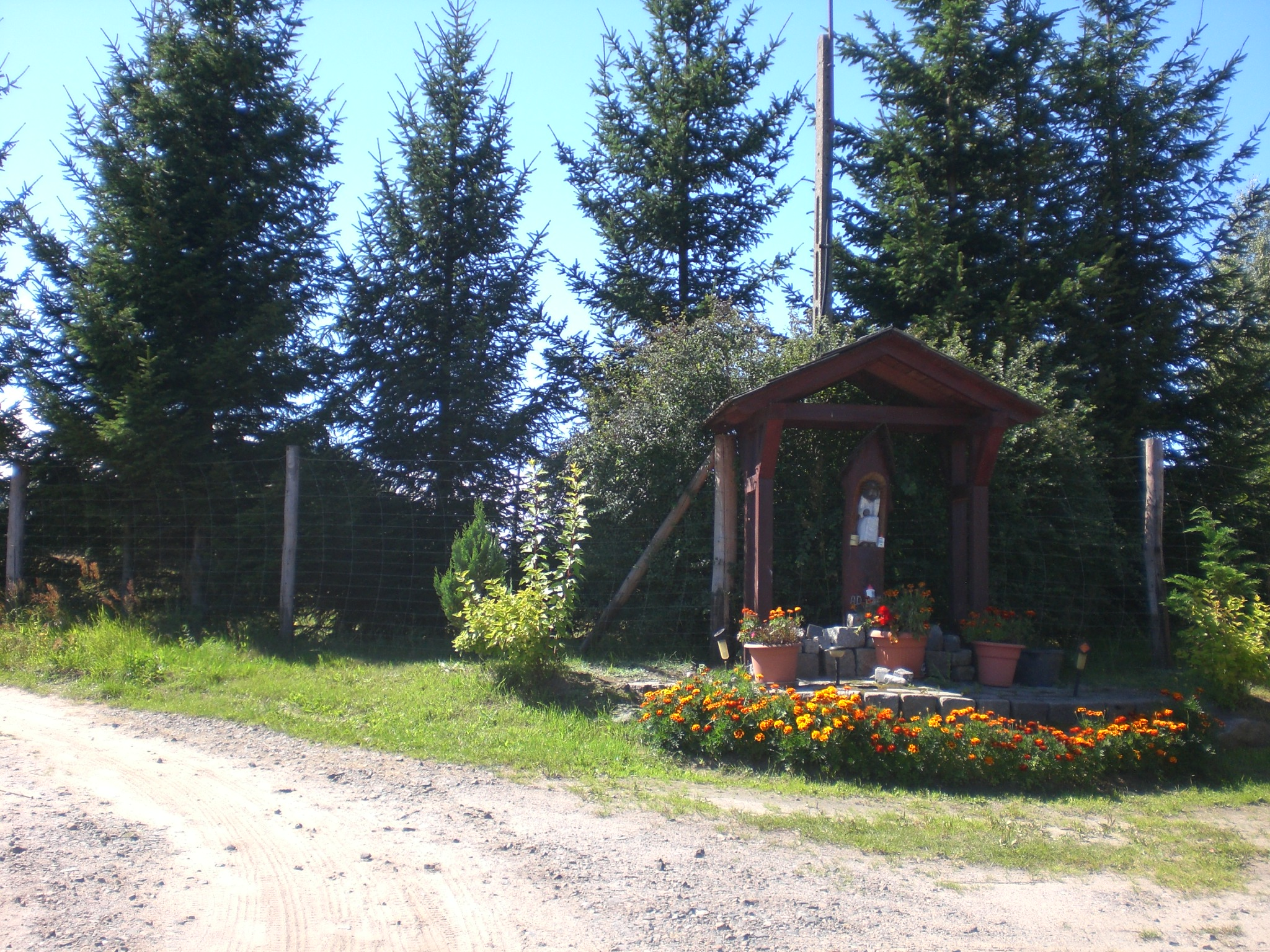

- Location within Poland
- Coordinates: 54°22′44″N 18°6′40″E
- Country: Poland
- Voivodeship: Pomeranian
- County: Kartuzy
- Gmina: Kartuzy
- Elevation: 204.8 m (672 ft)

Chojna [ˈxɔi̯na] (Cashubian Chòjna, German: Choina) is a settlement in the administrative district of Gmina Kartuzy, within Kartuzy County, Pomeranian Voivodeship, in northern Poland.

For details of the history of the region, see History of Pomerania.
