= Sarnówko, Gmina Kartuzy =

Sarnówko
- Settlement
- Location within Poland
- Coordinates: 54°16′24″N 18°6′52″E
- Country: Poland
- Voivodeship: Pomeranian
- County: Kartuzy
- Gmina: Kartuzy

Sarnówko [sarˈnufkɔ] is a settlement in the administrative district of Gmina Kartuzy, within Kartuzy County, Pomeranian Voivodeship, in northern Poland.

For details of the history of the region, see History of Pomerania.
