= Lake Gardno =

Lake in Poland

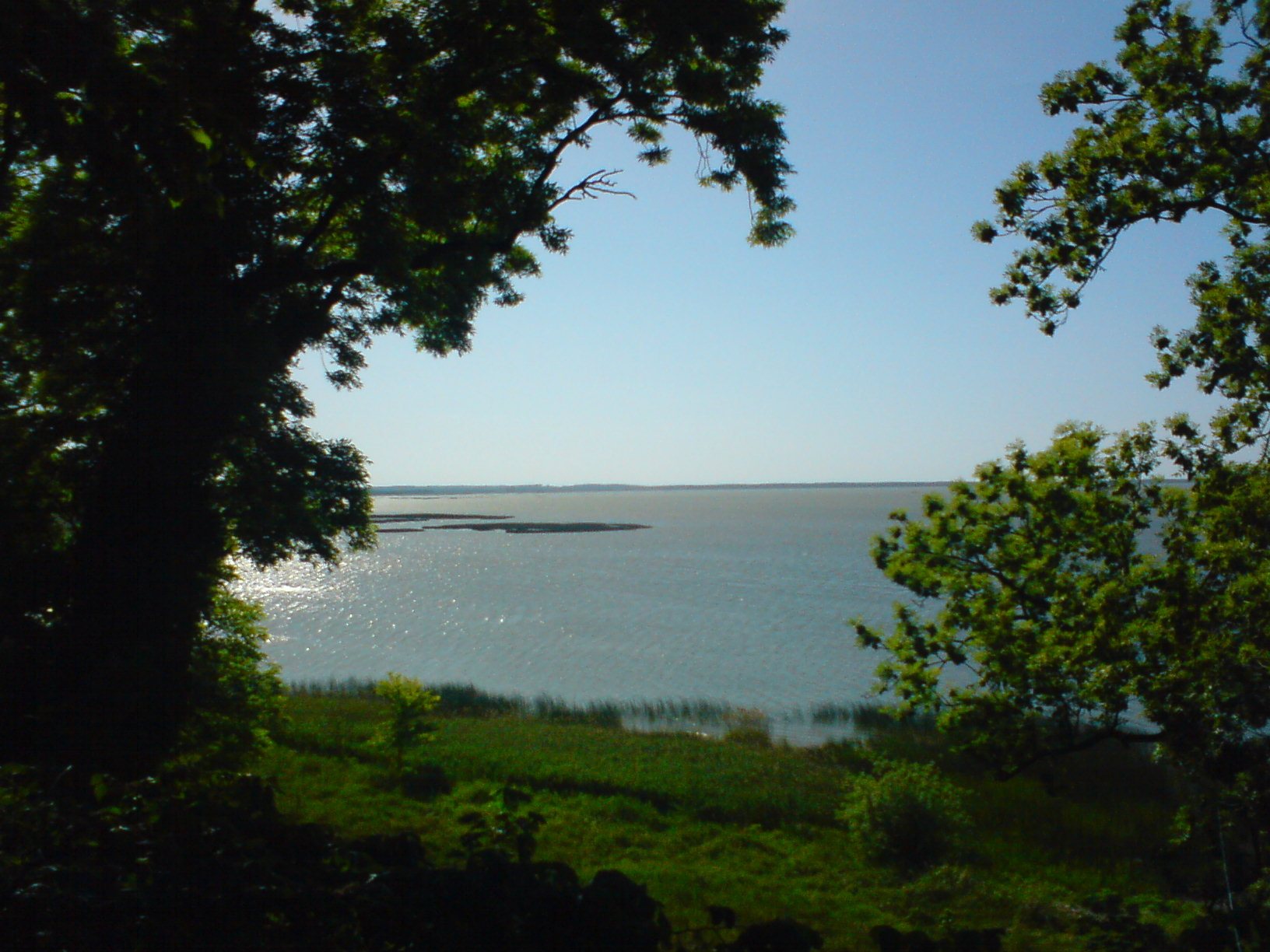

- Location within Poland Location within Pomeranian Voivodeship
- Location: Słowińskie Lakeland
- Coordinates: 54°39′14″N 17°06′44″E
- Basin countries: Poland
- Max. length: 6.8 km (4.2 mi)
- Max. width: 4.7 km (2.9 mi)
- Surface area: 24.69 km^{2} (9.53 sq mi)
- Max. depth: 2.6 m (8 ft 6 in)

Gardno (German: Garder See; Polish: Jezioro Gardno) is a lake in the Słowińskie Lakeland in Pomeranian Voivodship, Poland. It is the part of Słowiński National Park. Its area is 24.69 km^{2} (9.53 sq mi). It is 6.8 km long and 4.7 km wide. Maximum depth is 2.6 m.
