= Slovincian Coast =

Slovincian Coast Wybrzeże Słowińskie Słowińsczé Ùbrzeżé (in Kashubian)
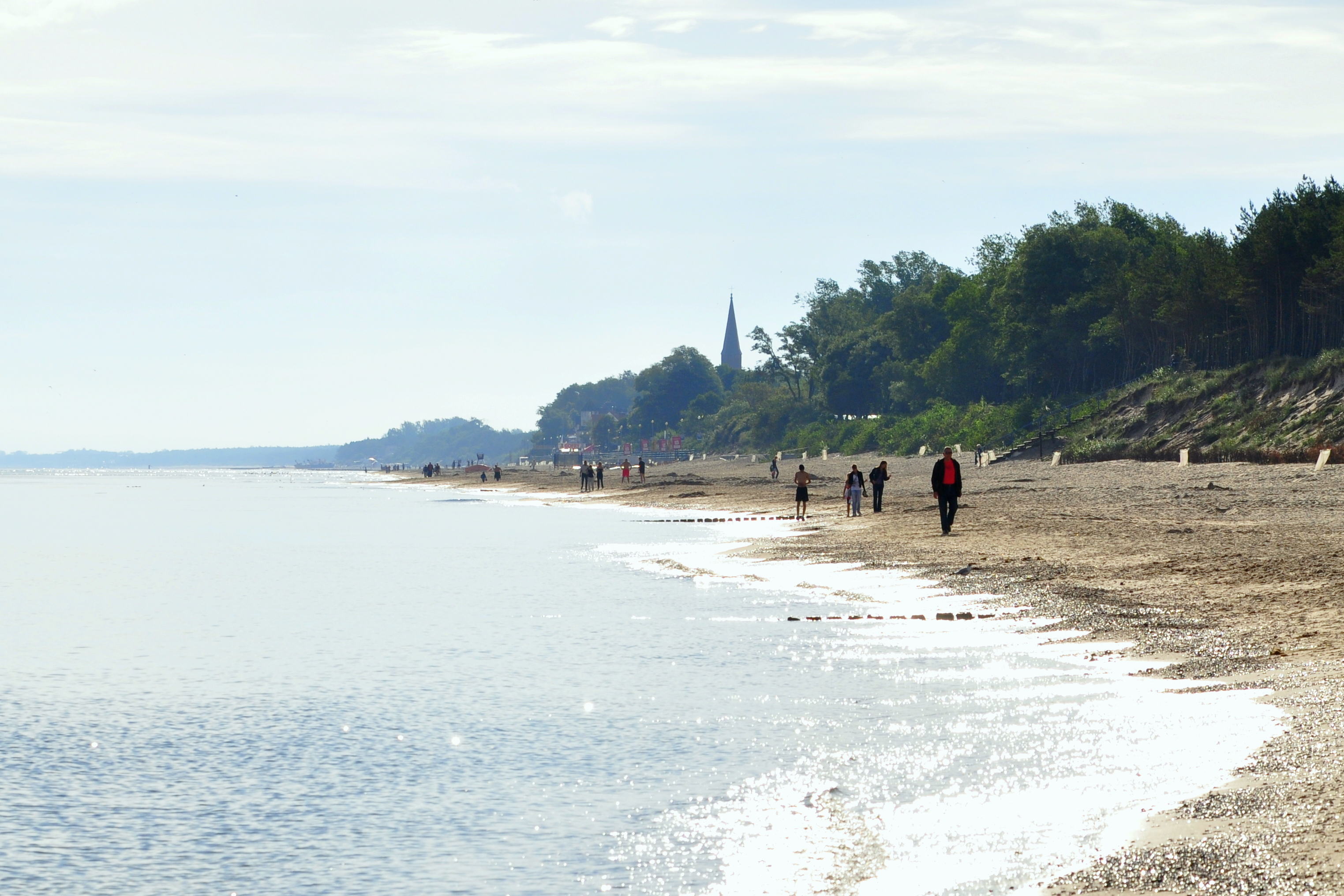
- Beach in Sarbinowo

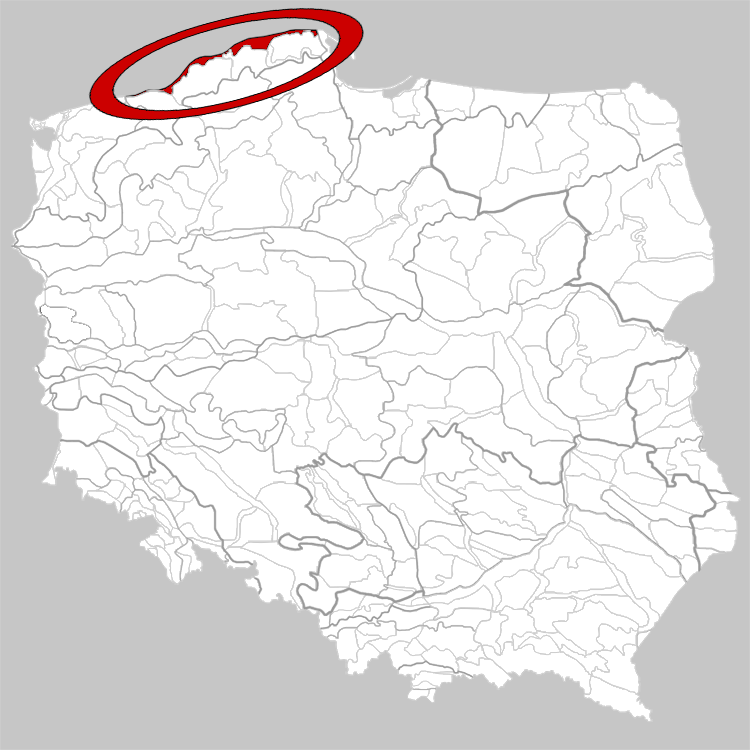
- Location of the Slovincian Coast in Poland
- Country: Poland

Area
  - Total: 1,132 km^{2} (437 sq mi)
- Time zone: UTC+1 (CET)
  - Summer (DST): UTC+2 (CEST)

The Slovincian Coast (Polish: Wybrzeże Słowińskie; Kashubian: Słowińsczé Ùbrzeżé) (313.41) is a mesoregion, the northernmost part of the Koszalin Coast, with an area of 1132 km^{2}. The highest hill is Rowokół, at 114,8 metres above sea level. The coast stretches from the west at Kołobrzeg, up to the east at Karwia. The region’s landscape mainly compromises of dunes, marshland and lakes (such as Łebsko Lake). The region is sparsely populated. The towns of Łeba, Ustka, Darłowo and Mielno are located on the coast. In the region of the Slovincian Coast is the Słowiński National Park, and the spas of Ustka and Dąbki.
