= Pręgowo Gdańskie railway station =

Railway station in Pomeranian Voivodeship, Poland

Coordinates: 54°15′29″N 18°28′43″E

Pręgowo Gdańskie
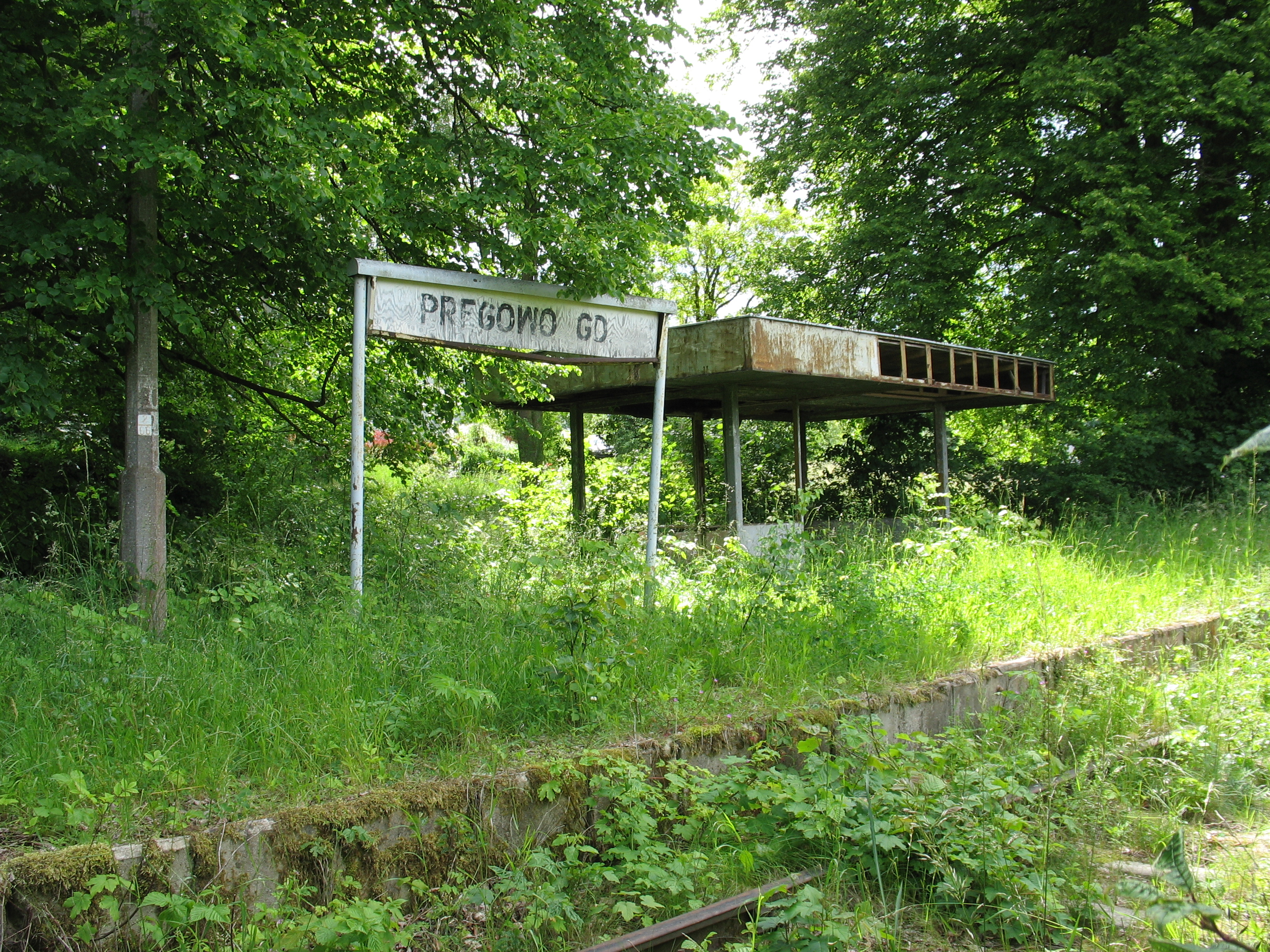
- Train halt in Pregowo Gdanskie, pomorskie, Poland

General information
- Location: Pręgowo Gdańskie; Poland
- Owner: Polskie Koleje Państwowe S.A.
- Platforms: 1

Construction
- Structure type: Building: Never existed Depot: Never existed Water tower: Never existed

History
- Opened: 1907
- Former names: Prangenau until 1945
Location

Pręgowo Gdańskie is a non-operational PKP railway station in Pręgowo Gdańskie (Pomeranian Voivodeship), Poland.

== Lines crossing the station ==
| Start station | End station | Line type |
|---|---|---|
| Pruszcz Gdański | Łeba | Closed |
