= Lębork Castle =

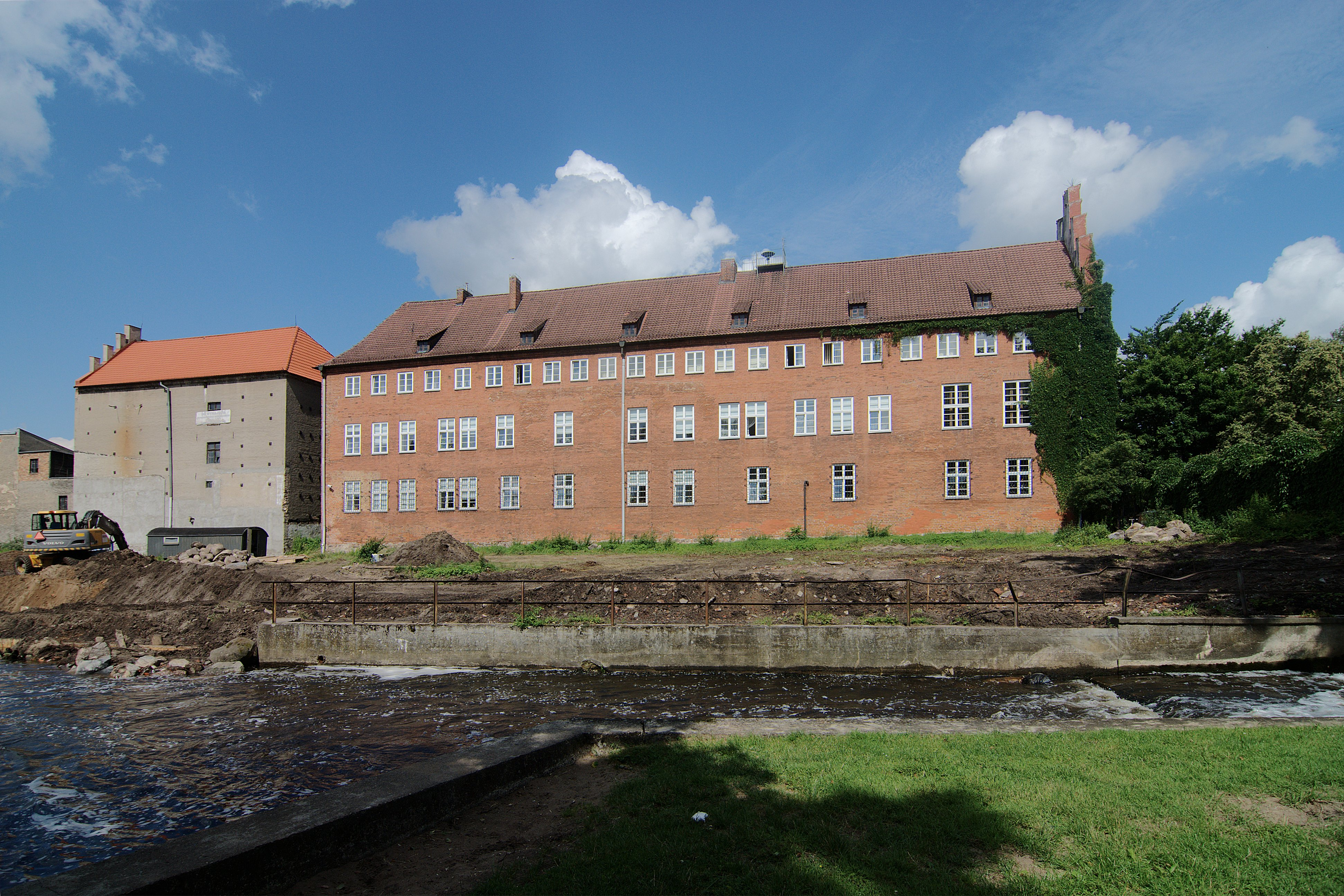
- Lębork Castle, presently housing the court house

- Location of Lębork Castle in Poland
- 54°32′36″N 17°45′12″E
- Location: Lębork, Pomeranian Voivodeship in Poland

History
- Built: 14th century

Site notes
- Architectural style: Gothic

Lębork Castle - a castle built by the Teutonic Order located in Lębork, Pomeranian Voivodeship. The building is found on the river Łeba.

The castle was built by the Teutonic Order in the fourteenth-century, in the Gothic architectural style shaped as a rectangle without a courtyard. The castle was the capital of the Teutonic vogts. In 1410, the castle came to be in the hands of Władysław II Jagiełło. During the Thirteen Years' War the castle was part of the Crown of the Kingdom of Poland, and after the Second Peace of Thorn was given as a fief to the Duke of Pomerania Eric II. In 1637, after the end of the duchy's dynasty, the castle was transferred back to Poland. From 157, the castle was under German rule. Frequently reconstructed in the nineteenth and twentieth centuries. Presently, the castle houses the court house of Lębork.
