= Łeba =

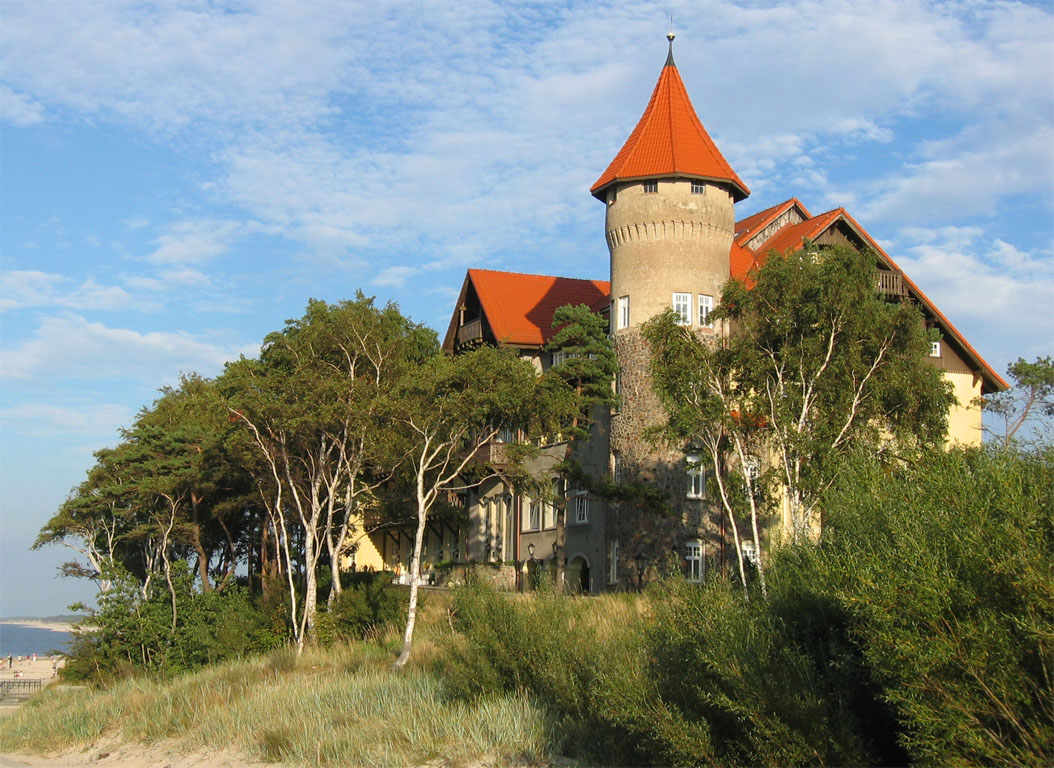
- Neptun hotel

- Flag Coat of arms

- Location within Poland
- Coordinates: 54°47′N 17°33′E
- Country: Poland
- Voivodeship: Pomeranian
- County: Lębork
- Gmina: Łeba (urban gmina)
- First mentioned: 1282
- Town rights: 1357

Area
  - Total: 14.8 km^{2} (5.7 sq mi)

Population (31 December 2019)
  - Total: 3,601
  - Density: 243/km^{2} (630/sq mi)
- Time zone: UTC+1 (CET)
  - Summer (DST): UTC+2 (CEST)
- Postal code: 84–360
- Vehicle registration: GLE
- Website: www.leba.eu

Łeba ([ˈwɛba], Kashubian: Łeba; German: Leba) is a seaside town in the Pomeranian Voivodeship of northern Poland. It is located in the region of Gdańsk Pomerania (Pomerelia), near Łebsko Lake and the mouth of the river Łeba on the Slovincian Coast of the Baltic Sea.

== History ==
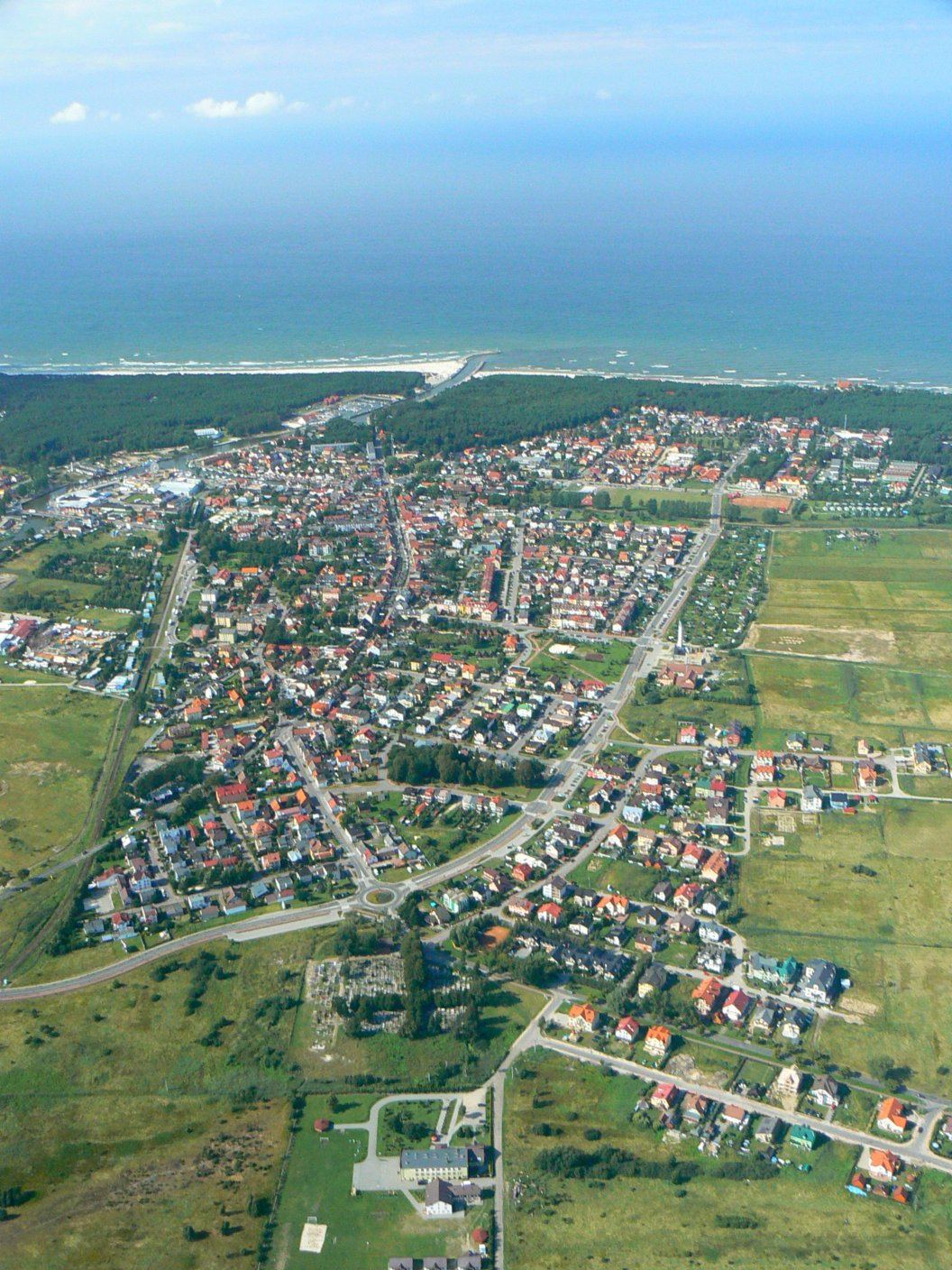
Aerial view of Łeba

The Pomerelian settlement of Łeba was first mentioned in a 1282 document of Mestwin II, Duke of Pomerania. At that time the village was located about two kilometers (1.2 miles) west from the present mouth of the Łeba River. The church of St. Nicholas was mentioned in 1296. Łeba was part of fragmented Poland until 1309, when it was annexed by the Teutonic Order after their takeover of Gdańsk. Łeba received municipal rights by the State of the Teutonic Order in 1357. Located at the Łebsko Lake at the Baltic Sea, it developed to a fishing port and a wood marketplace.

In 1440, the town joined the Prussian Confederation, which opposed Teutonic rule, and upon the request of which King Casimir IV Jagiellon reincorporated the territory to the Kingdom of Poland in 1454. With Lauenburg (Lębork) Land it became a Polish fief during the Thirteen Years' War in 1455, held by the Dukes of Pomerania.

Old Łeba was threatened for many centuries by floods and expanding sand dunes and therefore was rebuilt in a safer location after 1558. The town was reintegrated with the Polish Crown after the death of the last Pomeranian duke Bogislaw XIV as part of the Pomeranian Voivodeship, until King John II Casimir Vasa enfeoffed Elector Frederick William I of Brandenburg-Prussia with Lauenburg Land by the 1657 Treaty of Bydgoszcz.

With the First Partition of Poland in 1772, Łeba was incorporated into Prussia. Soon after a large port was built on instruction of the Prussian king, whereby a 34-metre (112-foot) broad channel between the Leba lake and the Baltic Sea was dug, which however did not weather the storms on the coast. Due to its picturesque setting, the Leba seaside after World War I became a popular resort for German bohémiens. The painter Max Pechstein and other expressionists frequented the place.

In the proximity of Leba there is a large former testing area for long-range rocket weapons operated by the Rheinmetall company. On the Leba spit the German long-range rocket Rheinbote was tested between 1941 and 1945. Also the V-1 flying bomb was tested there from 1943 to 1945. Between 1963 and 1973 33 Meteor sounding rockets were launched from Łeba.

In March 1945, shortly before the end of World War II, the region was occupied by the Red Army. Following the Potsdam Conference, after the end of the war the town was placed under Polish administration. It became part of Poland due to the 1991 Border Treaty between reunited Germany and liberated Poland. Stalin forced the Polish People's Republic into the Eastern Bloc. In 1989, the iron curtain fell and the Third Polish Republic was founded.

== Transport ==
Łeba is at the end of voivodeship road 214. This road connects Łeba to the town of Lębork to the south.

Łeba is also linked to Lębork by a single track railway line. PKP Intercity operates a train from Lębork to Łeba 5 times a day. Regional trains also operate on this line.

Bus no 210 also connects Łeba to Lębork. The journey takes about 30 minutes.

== Landmarks ==
There is an abundance of architectural and natural attractions near Łeba, above all the Słowiński National Park with its moving sand dunes, about 8 kilometres (5 miles) west of the city. Further objects of interest include:

- Ruins of the St. Nicholas church west of the city
- Fishermen's church of 1683 with a painting by Max Pechstein
- Fishermen's dwellings from the 19th century in Kościuszki street
- 19th century casino on Nadmorska street, today the Hotel Neptun
- Former rocket test site near Pletka
- Dinosaur park south of the city
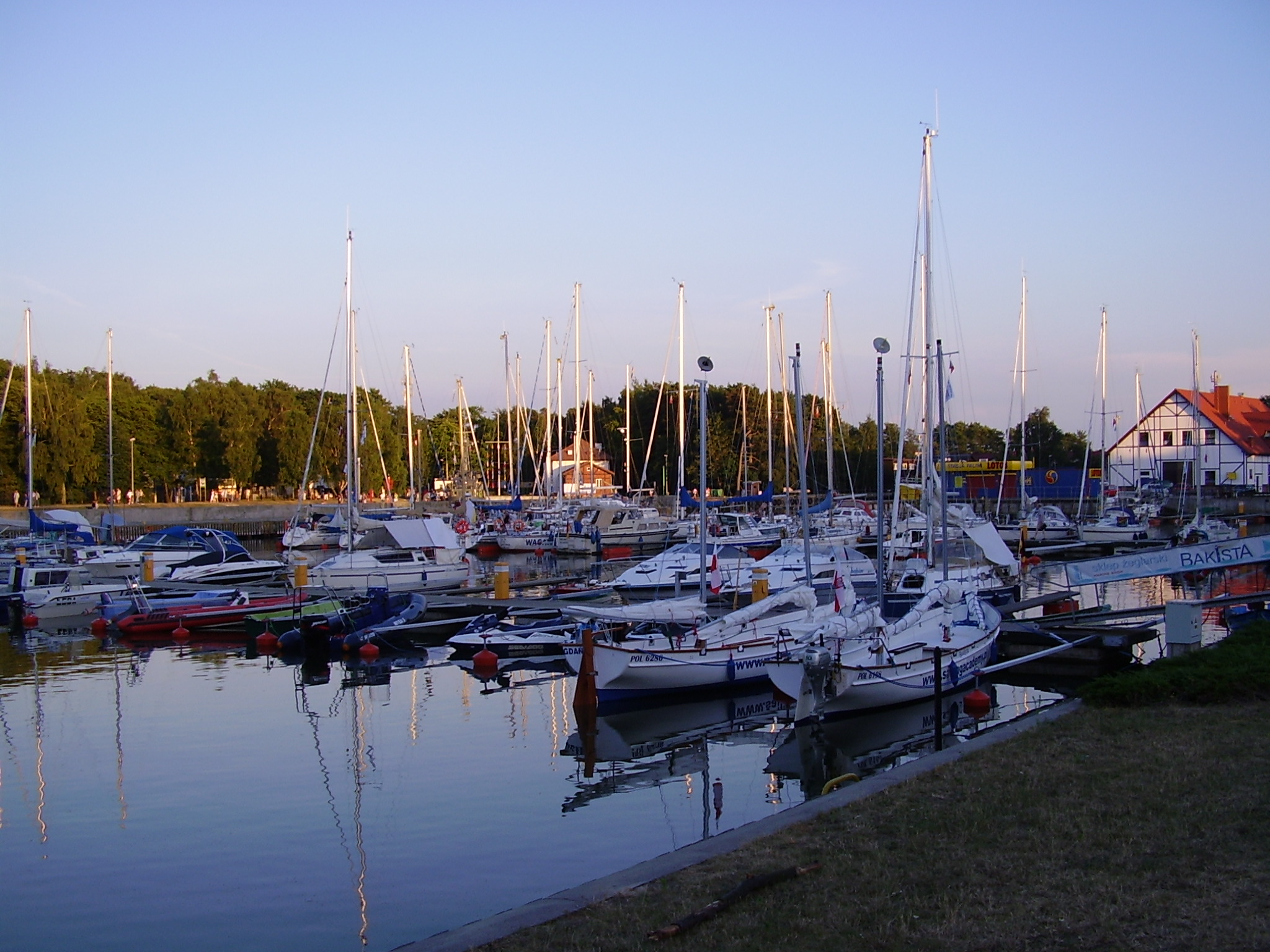
Yacht port in Łeba

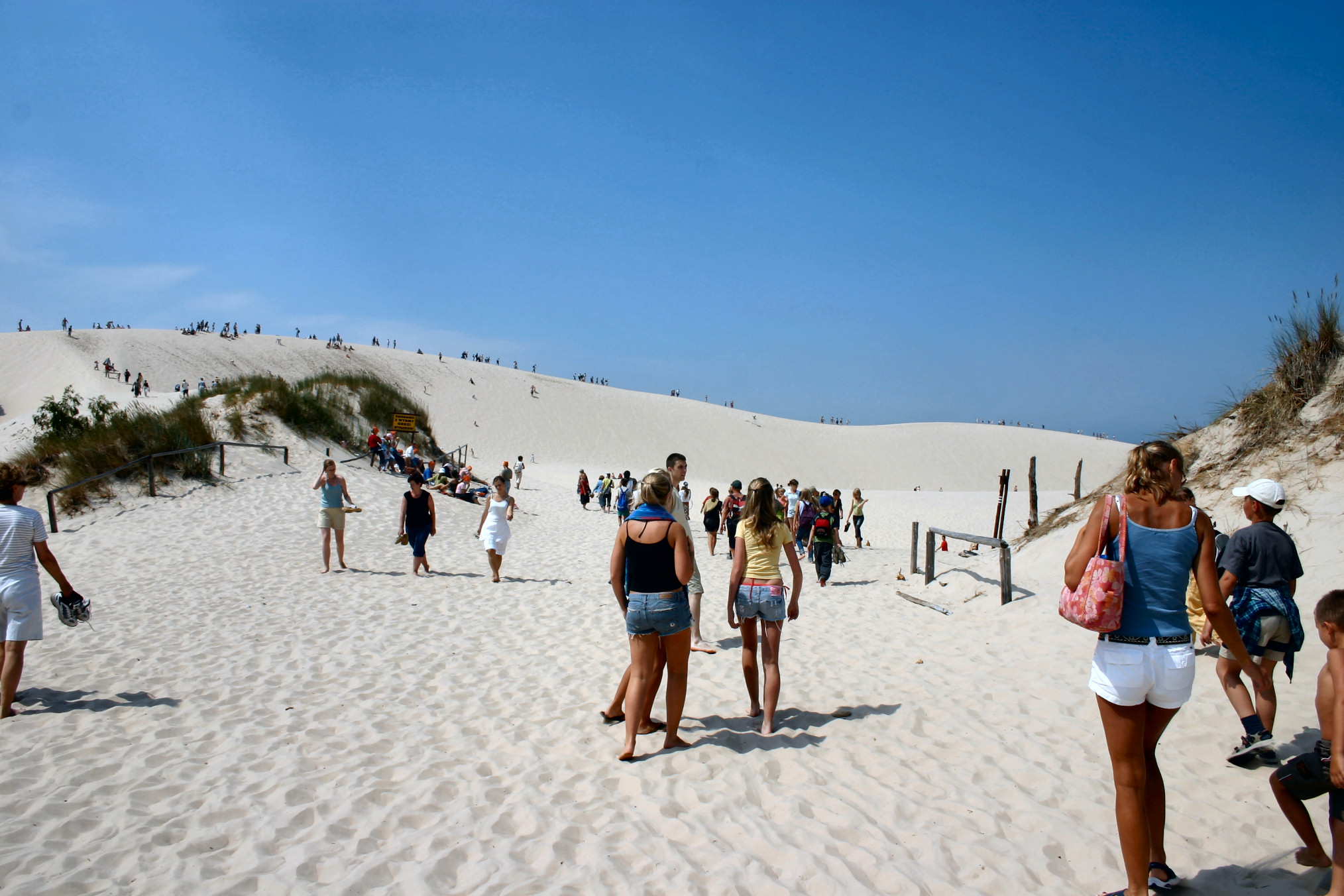
Beachgoers on the white sand dunes of Łeba

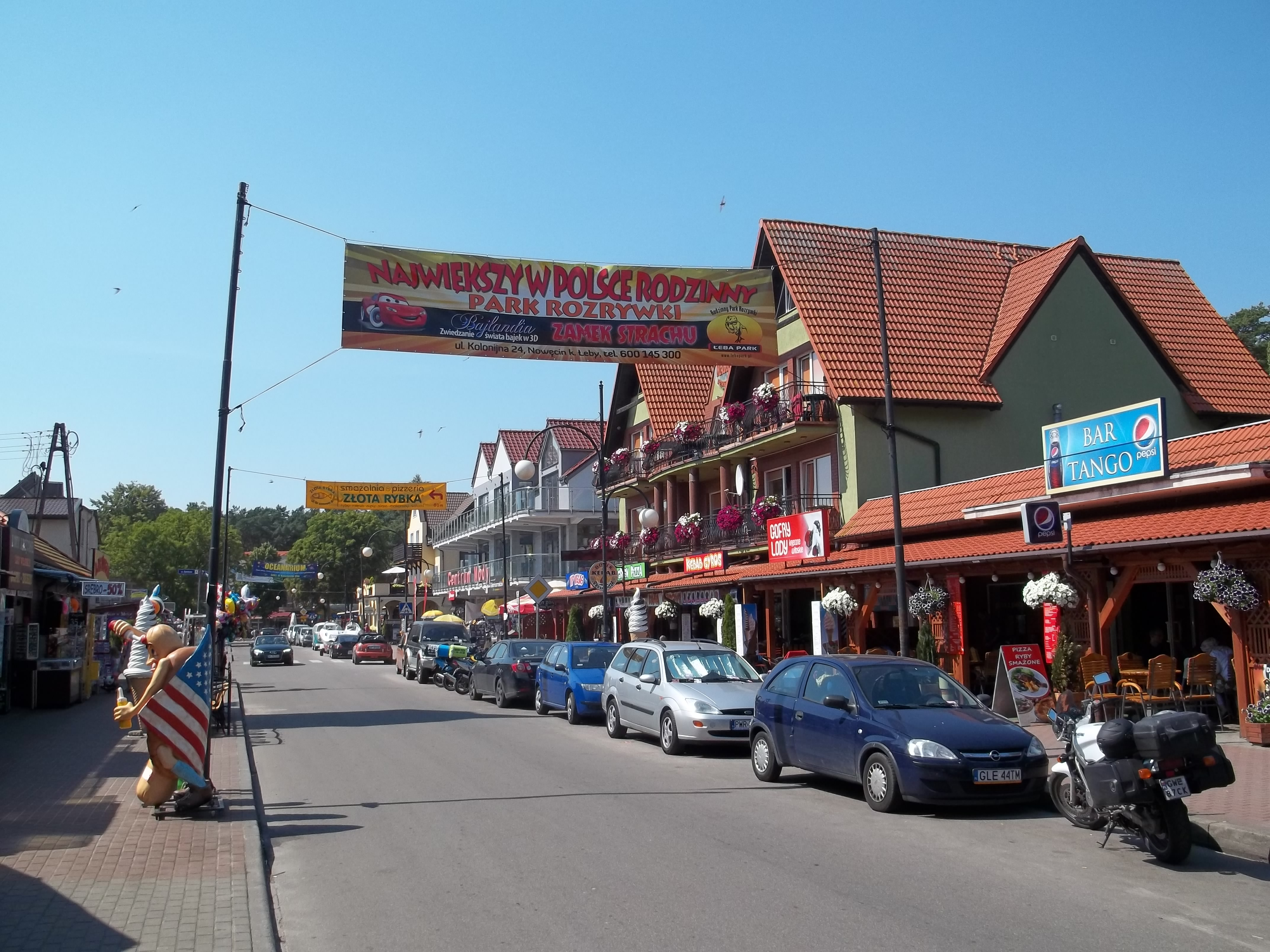
Nadmorska, one of the main tourist streets in Łeba, facing west

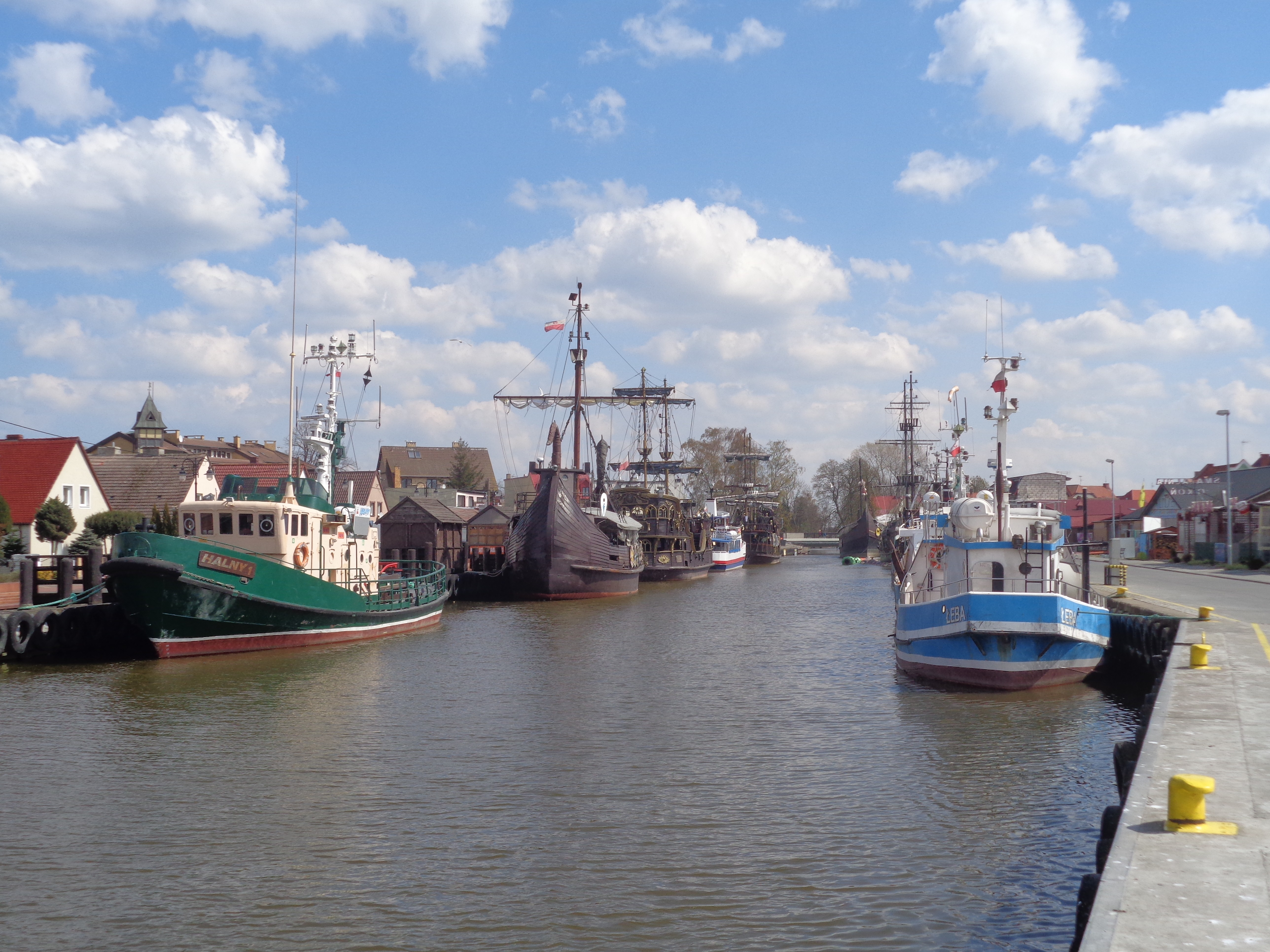
Port of Łeba

== Climate ==
Łeba has an oceanic climate (Köppen climate classification: Cfb).

Climate data for Łeba (1991–2020 normals, extremes 1951–present)
Month	Jan	Feb	Mar	Apr	May	Jun	Jul	Aug	Sep	Oct	Nov	Dec	Year
Record high °C (°F)	12.1 (53.8)	16.8 (62.2)	22.6 (72.7)	29.6 (85.3)	32.4 (90.3)	33.7 (92.7)	34.9 (94.8)	37.2 (99.0)	32.1 (89.8)	27.6 (81.7)	20.3 (68.5)	12.9 (55.2)	37.2 (99.0)
Mean maximum °C (°F)	7.9 (46.2)	9.1 (48.4)	14.5 (58.1)	22.0 (71.6)	26.1 (79.0)	28.6 (83.5)	29.6 (85.3)	29.1 (84.4)	24.6 (76.3)	18.8 (65.8)	12.7 (54.9)	8.7 (47.7)	31.4 (88.5)
Mean daily maximum °C (°F)	2.4 (36.3)	3.1 (37.6)	6.0 (42.8)	11.3 (52.3)	15.7 (60.3)	19.1 (66.4)	21.5 (70.7)	21.7 (71.1)	17.9 (64.2)	12.6 (54.7)	7.2 (45.0)	3.7 (38.7)	11.9 (53.4)
Daily mean °C (°F)	0.2 (32.4)	0.6 (33.1)	2.7 (36.9)	6.9 (44.4)	11.2 (52.2)	15.0 (59.0)	17.5 (63.5)	17.5 (63.5)	13.9 (57.0)	9.3 (48.7)	4.9 (40.8)	1.6 (34.9)	8.4 (47.1)
Mean daily minimum °C (°F)	−2.1 (28.2)	−1.9 (28.6)	−0.2 (31.6)	2.9 (37.2)	6.9 (44.4)	10.8 (51.4)	13.5 (56.3)	13.3 (55.9)	10.2 (50.4)	6.2 (43.2)	2.5 (36.5)	−0.6 (30.9)	5.1 (41.2)
Mean minimum °C (°F)	−11.7 (10.9)	−9.7 (14.5)	−7.3 (18.9)	−3.7 (25.3)	−0.2 (31.6)	4.4 (39.9)	7.8 (46.0)	7.8 (46.0)	3.6 (38.5)	−0.8 (30.6)	−4.0 (24.8)	−8.6 (16.5)	−14.5 (5.9)
Record low °C (°F)	−23.2 (−9.8)	−27.4 (−17.3)	−19.0 (−2.2)	−7.5 (18.5)	−4.8 (23.4)	−1.6 (29.1)	4.1 (39.4)	1.8 (35.2)	−2.5 (27.5)	−6.1 (21.0)	−15.4 (4.3)	−19.7 (−3.5)	−27.4 (−17.3)
Average precipitation mm (inches)	43.0 (1.69)	34.0 (1.34)	37.7 (1.48)	27.9 (1.10)	48.7 (1.92)	53.2 (2.09)	73.3 (2.89)	79.8 (3.14)	75.1 (2.96)	76.8 (3.02)	58.9 (2.32)	53.2 (2.09)	661.7 (26.05)
Average extreme snow depth cm (inches)	4.7 (1.9)	5.9 (2.3)	3.4 (1.3)	0.5 (0.2)	0.1 (0.0)	0.0 (0.0)	0.0 (0.0)	0.0 (0.0)	0.0 (0.0)	0.3 (0.1)	1.1 (0.4)	4.4 (1.7)	5.9 (2.3)
Average precipitation days (≥ 0.1 mm)	17.57	16.14	14.00	10.80	11.27	12.27	13.53	14.63	14.90	16.10	17.53	19.03	177.77
Average snowy days (≥ 0 cm)	11.8	12.0	5.4	0.4	0.1	0.0	0.0	0.0	0.0	0.2	1.5	7.1	38.5
Average relative humidity (%)	85.9	85.0	82.1	78.1	78.4	79.3	81.3	81.3	82.2	83.9	87.6	87.9	82.8
Mean monthly sunshine hours	42.8	67.1	133.1	213.6	281.3	277.2	274.7	249.0	176.1	109.8	48.3	31.6	1,904.5
Source 1: Institute of Meteorology and Water Management
Source 2: Meteomodel.pl (records, relative humidity 1991–2020)

== Demographics ==
Since the medieval Christianization of the region, the local population was Catholic. After the Reformation, the inhabitants of the town were predominantly Protestants and the area was subjected to Germanisation. Since the end of World War II the population is predominantly composed of Polish Roman Catholics.

Number of inhabitants in years
Year	Inhabitants	Notes
1782	503	no Jews.
1784	497	
1794	526	no Jews.
1812	707	incl. four Catholics and 16 Jews.
1816	639	incl. two Catholics and 12 Jews.
1831	806	incl. seven Catholics and two Jews.
1843	948	incl. four Catholics and two Jews.
1852	1,093	incl. seven Catholics and eight Jews.
1861	1,236	incl. seven Catholics, eight Jews and one German Catholic.
1900	1,966	
1925	2,330	
1939	2,846	
1978	3,649	

== See also ==
- Łeba (PKP station)
- Slovincians

== Famous people ==
- Klaus Weiher, a noble of the Weyher family
- Martin Weiher (1512–1556) (de) Lutheran bishop of Cammin

== International relations ==
Łeba is twinned with:

Borgholm, Sweden; Hohnstorf, Germany; Neringa, Lithuania	Parma, Italy; Zelenogradsk, Russia
