= Slovincian National Park =

National park in Poland

- IUCN category II (national park)
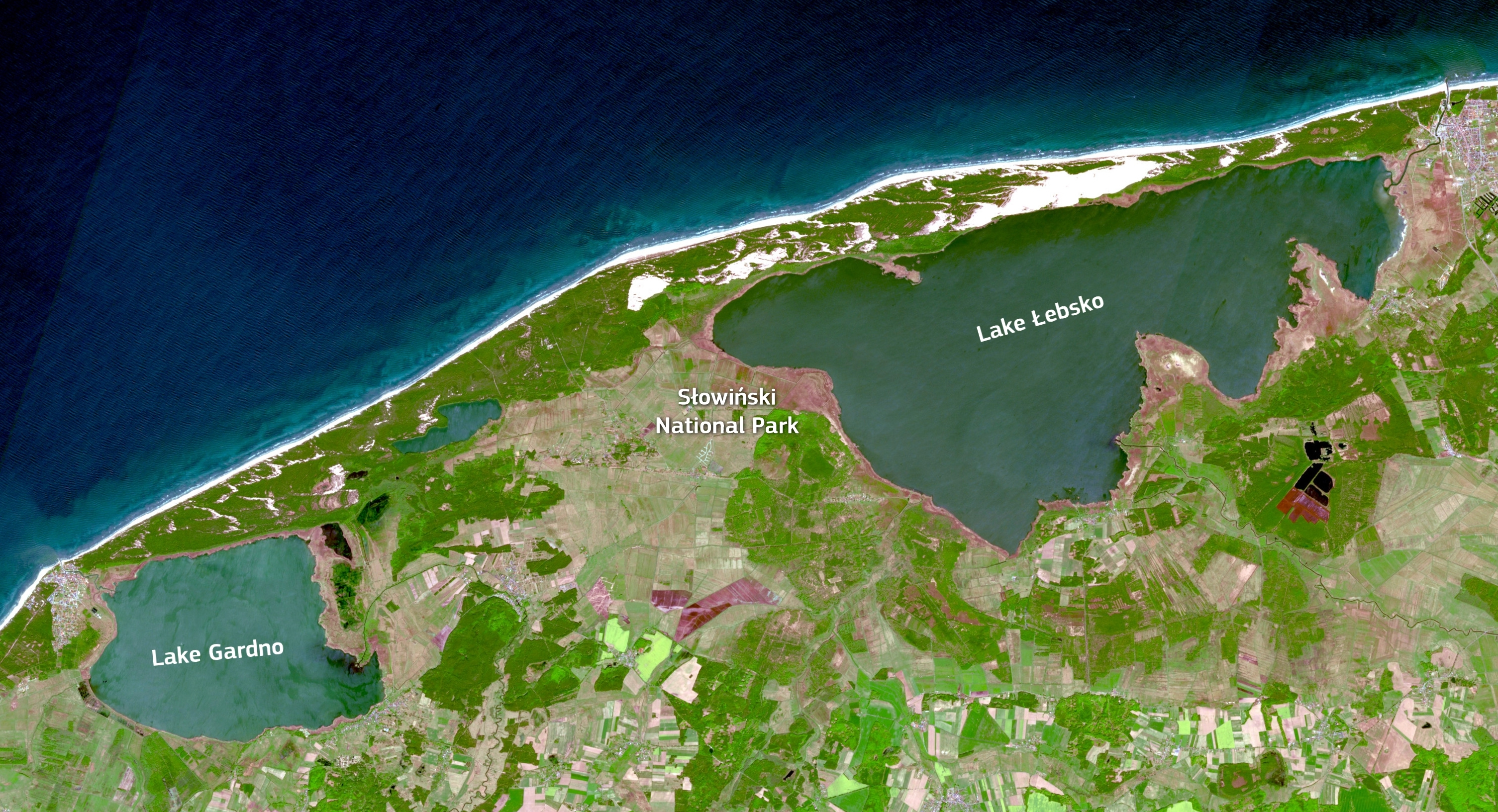
- A satellite image of the park
- Interactive map of Slovincian National Park
- Location: Pomeranian Voivodeship, Poland
- Nearest city: Słupsk
- Coordinates: 54°42′12″N 17°18′25″E
- Area: 186.18 km^{2} (71.88 sq mi)
- Established: 1967
- Governing body: Ministry of the Environment
- Website: Official website

Ramsar Wetland
- Designated: 24 October 1995
- Reference no.: 757

The Slovincian National Park (Polish: Słowiński Park Narodowy), also known as Słowiński National Park, is a national park in Pomeranian Voivodeship, northern Poland. It is situated on the Baltic coast, between Łeba and Rowy. The northern boundary of the park consists of 32.5 kilometres (20.2 mi) of coastline.

== History ==
The original idea of creating a preserve here was floated in 1946, at a conference in Łeba with scientists from Poznań and Gdańsk. The park, however, was created 21 years later, in 1967, on an area of 180.69 km^{2} (69.76 sq mi). Today it is slightly larger, covering 186.18 km^{2} (71.88 sq mi), of which 102.13 km^{2} (39.43 sq mi) consists of waters and 45.99 km^{2} (17.76 sq mi) of forests. The strictly preserved zone covers 56.19 km^{2} (21.70 sq mi). In 1977 UNESCO designated the park a biosphere reserve under its Programme on Man and the Biosphere (MaB). The Slovincian wetlands were designated a Ramsar site in 1995.

The park is named after the West Slavic (later Germanized) people known as the Slovincians (Polish: Słowińcy), who used to live in this swampy, inaccessible area at the edge of Lake Leba. In the village of Kluki, there is an open-air museum presenting aspects of this people's former life and culture.

== Geography ==
In the past, the park's area was a Baltic Sea bay. The sea's activity, however, created sand dunes which in the course of time separated the bay from the Baltic Sea. As waves and wind carry sand inland the dunes slowly move, at a speed of 3 to 10 metres per year. Some dunes are quite high - up to 30 metres. The highest peak of the park – Rowokol (115 metres (377 ft) above sea level) – is also an excellent observation point. The "moving dunes" are regarded as a curiosity of nature on a European scale.

Waters, which occupy 55% of park's area, are made up of lakes - Łebsko (71.40 km^{2} (27.57 sq mi), maximum depth 6.3 m (21 ft)), Gardno (24.68 km^{2} (9.53 sq mi), maximum depth 2.6 m (8.5 ft)) and Dolgie Wielkie (1.46 km^{2} (0.56 sq mi), maximum depth 2.9 m (9.5 ft)). Both Lebsko and Gardno lakes were previously bays. There are also seven rivers crossing the park, the largest being the Łeba and the Łupawa.

Forests in the park are mainly made of pines. These trees cover 80% of wooded areas; there are also peat bogs of several types. Of animals, the most numerous are birds with 257 species. This is because the park is located on the paths of migrating birds. They feel safe here because human activities are limited. The most interesting species are: erne, eagle owl, crow, swan and various kinds of ducks. Among the mammals, there are deer, wild pigs and hares.

== Tourist amenities ==
There are around 140 kilometres (87 mi) of tourist walking trails. Beside the lakes are observation towers and along the trails one can find benches and resting places. Around the park there are many parking sites as well as hotels and camp sites, especially in Łeba.

== Images ==
Logo

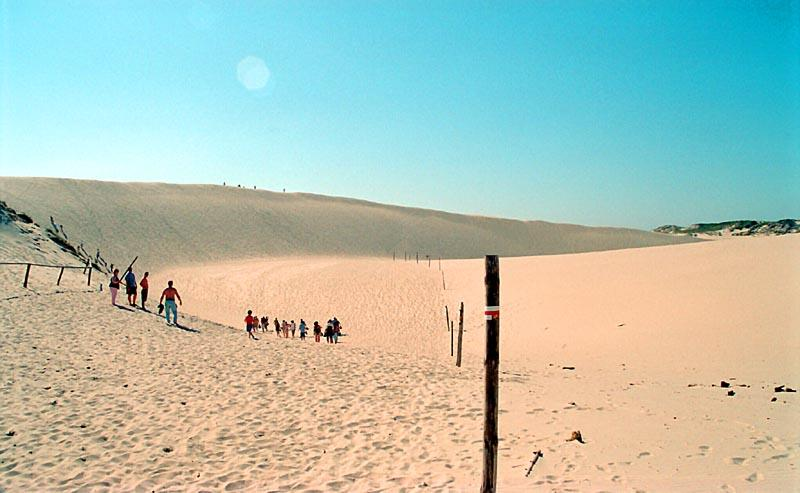
Moving dunes

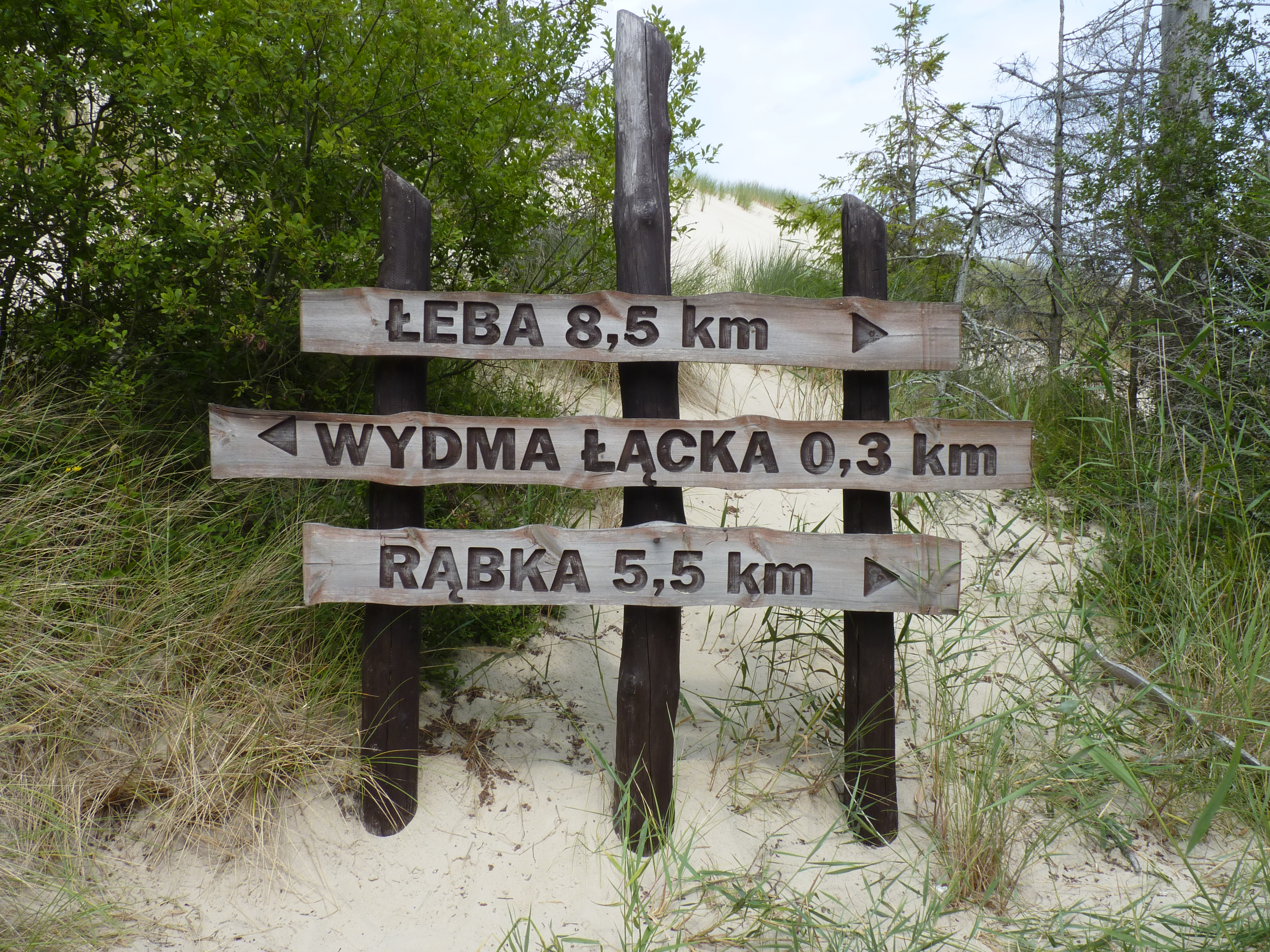
Signpost

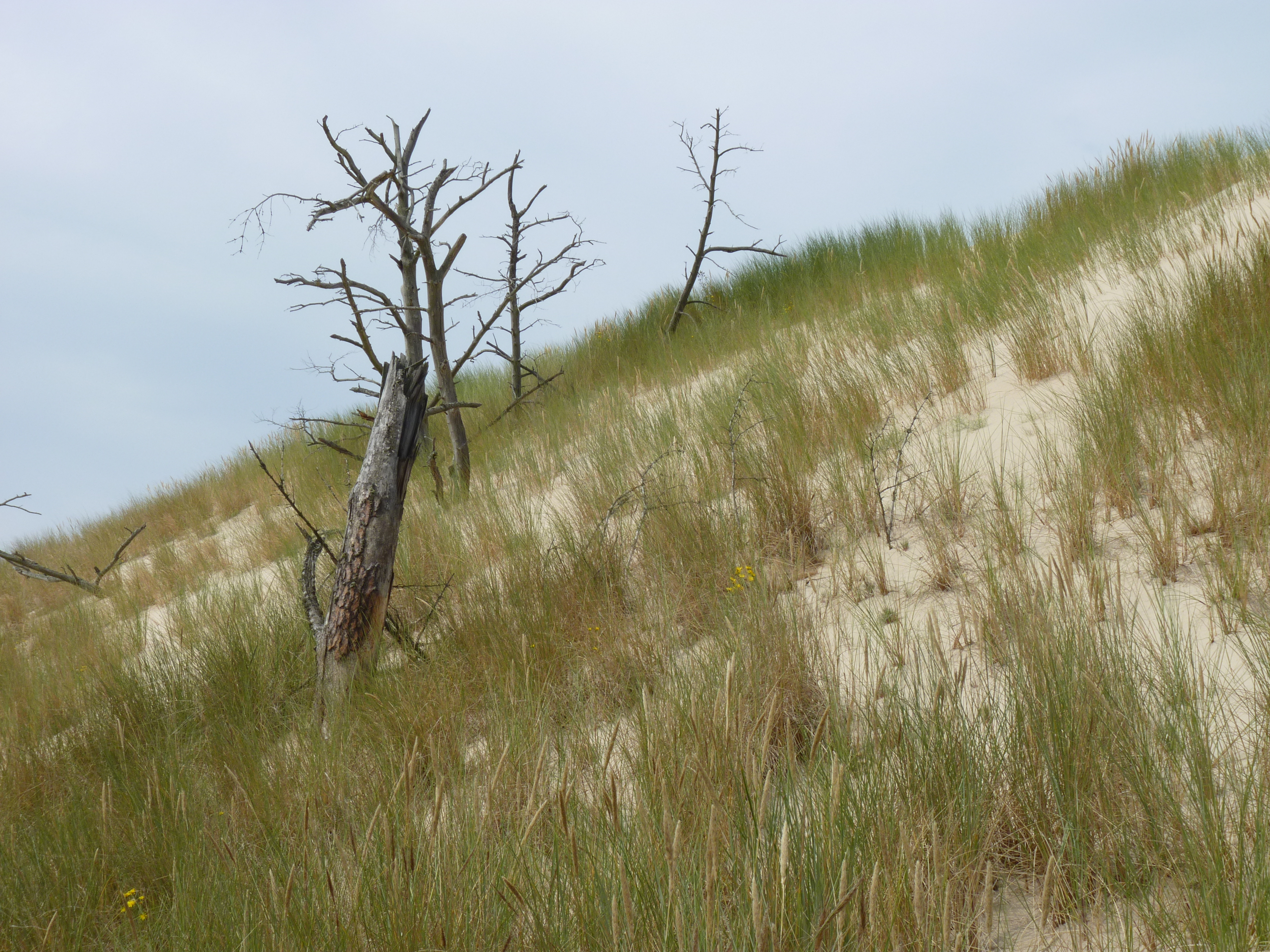
Dune

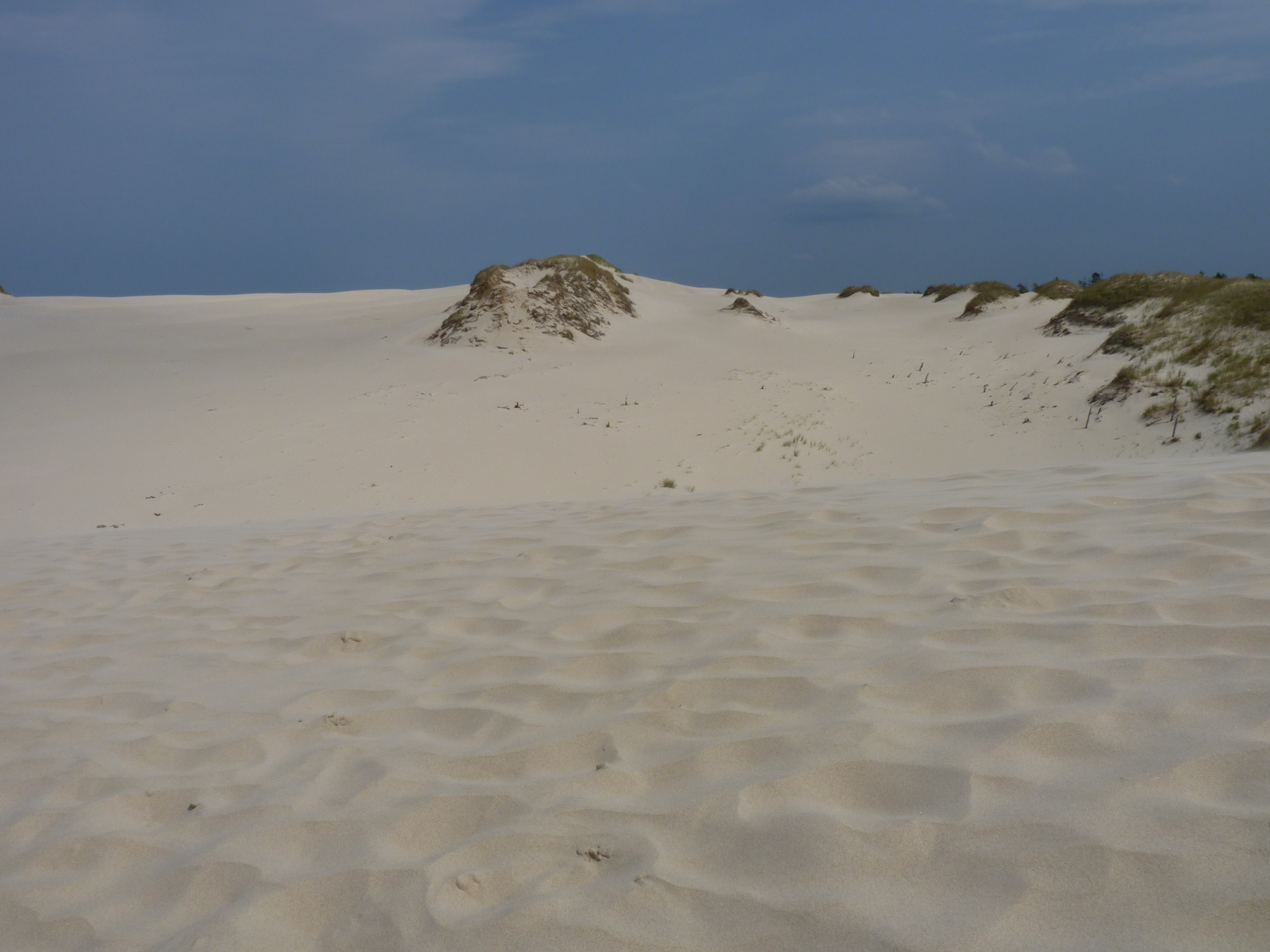
Dune

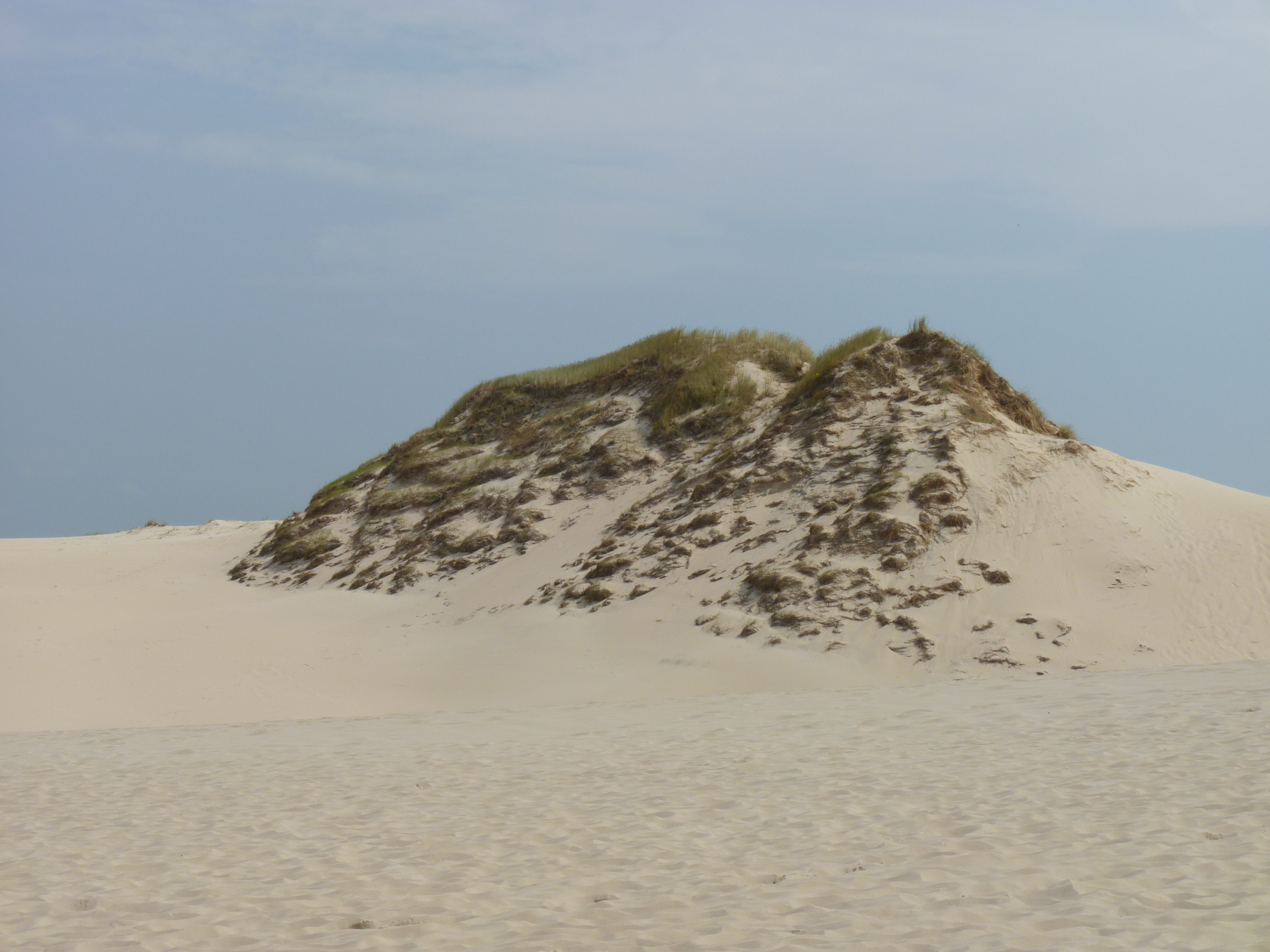
Dune

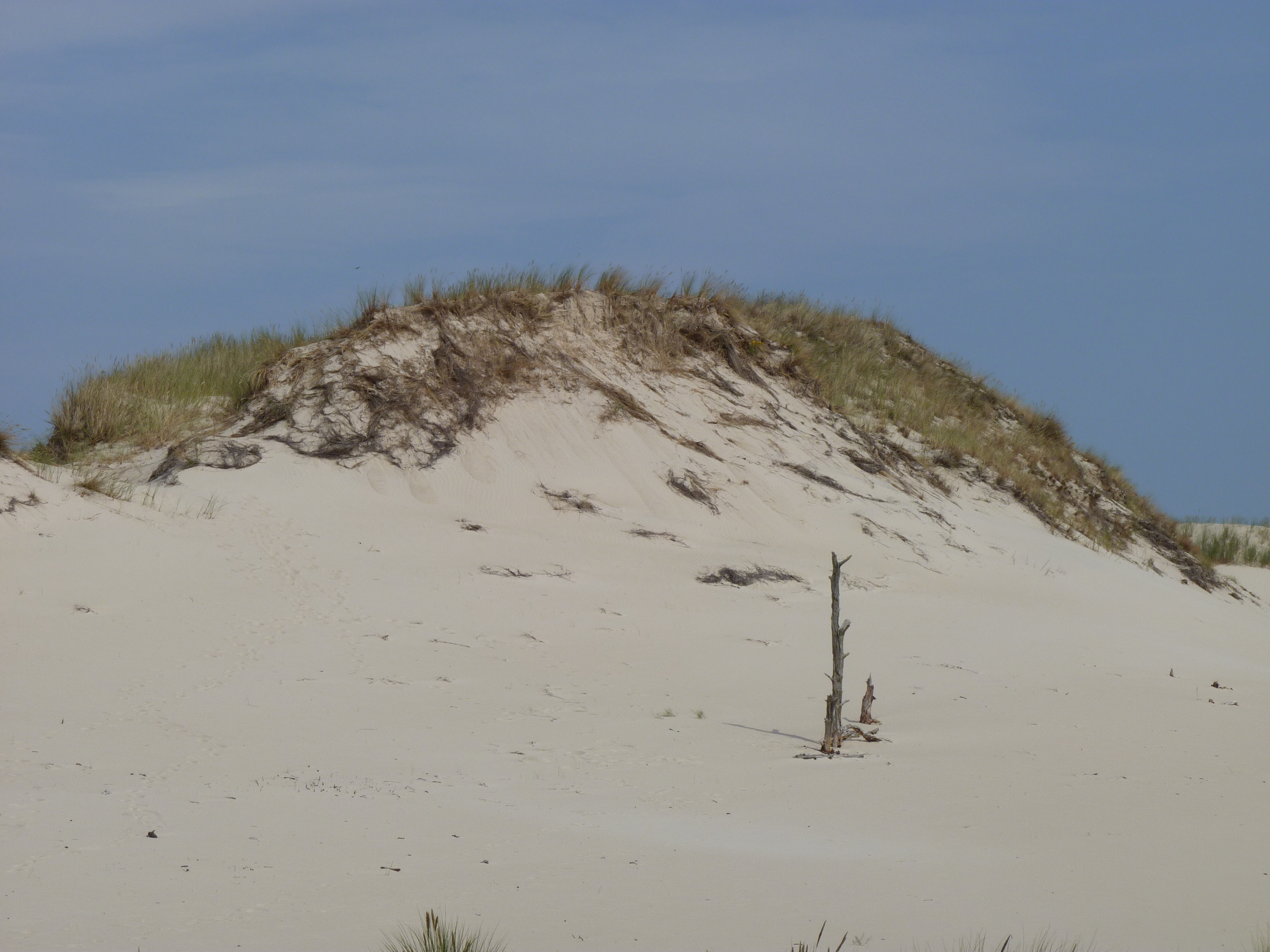
Dune

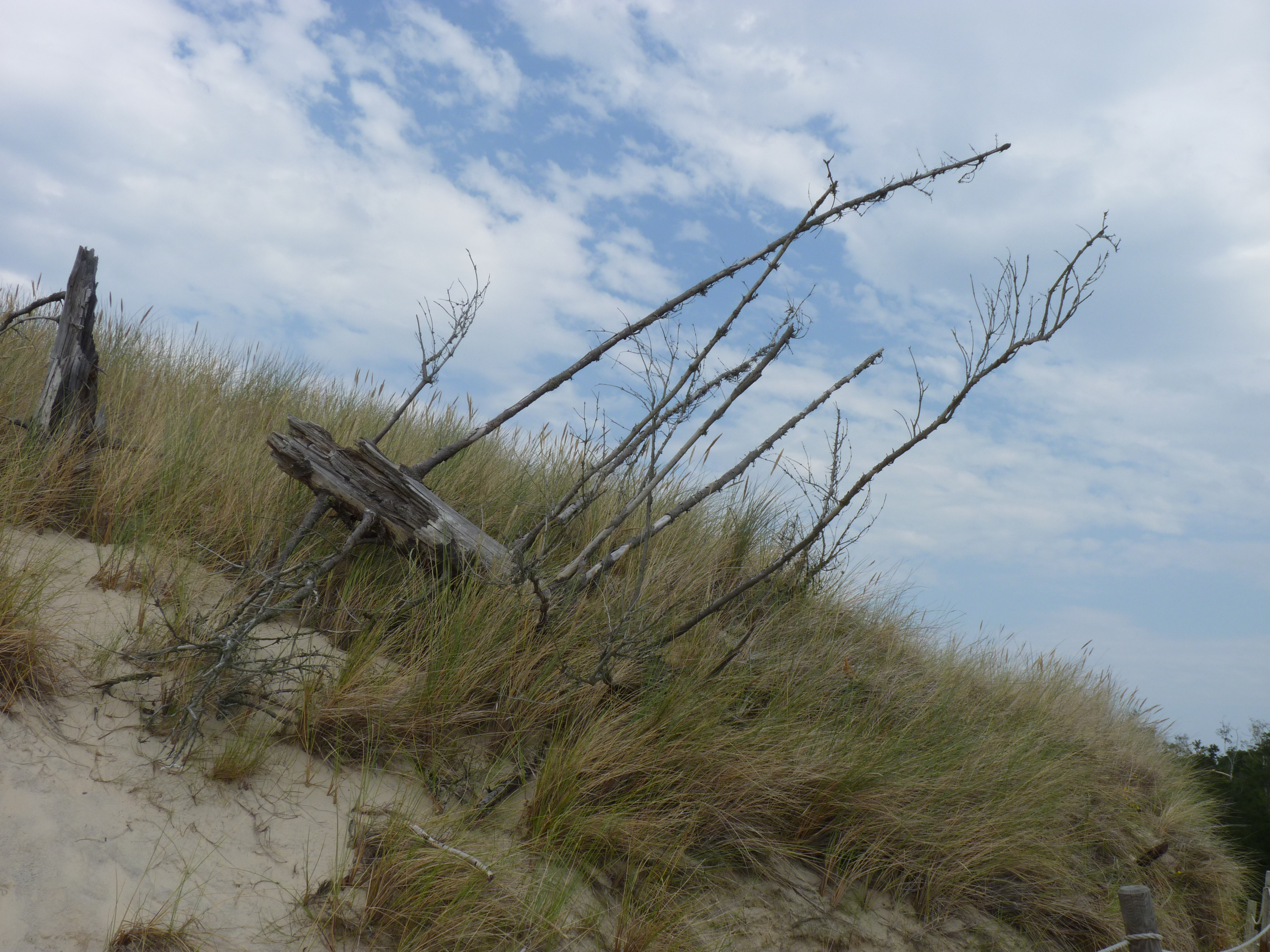
Dead trees

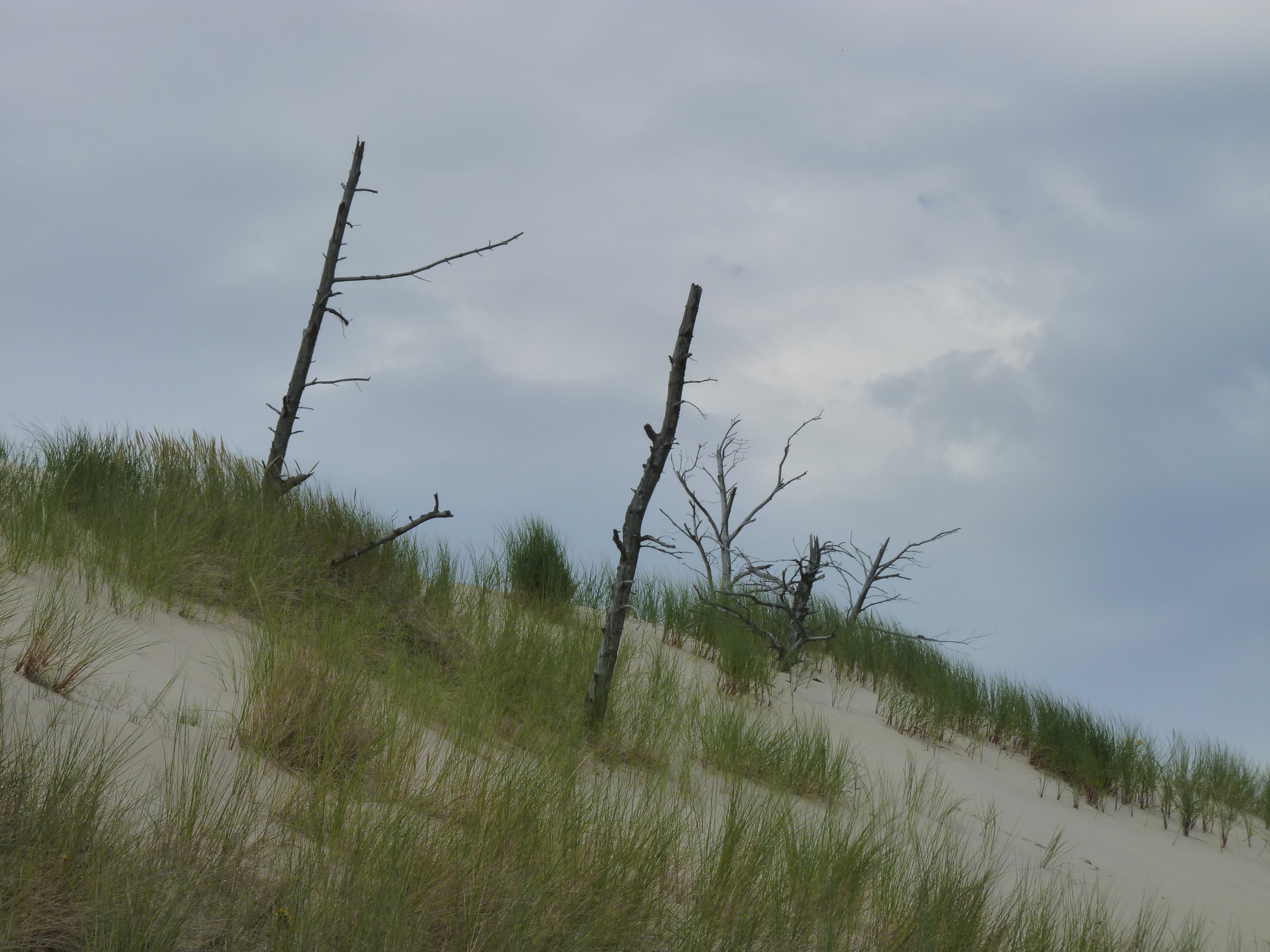
Dead trees

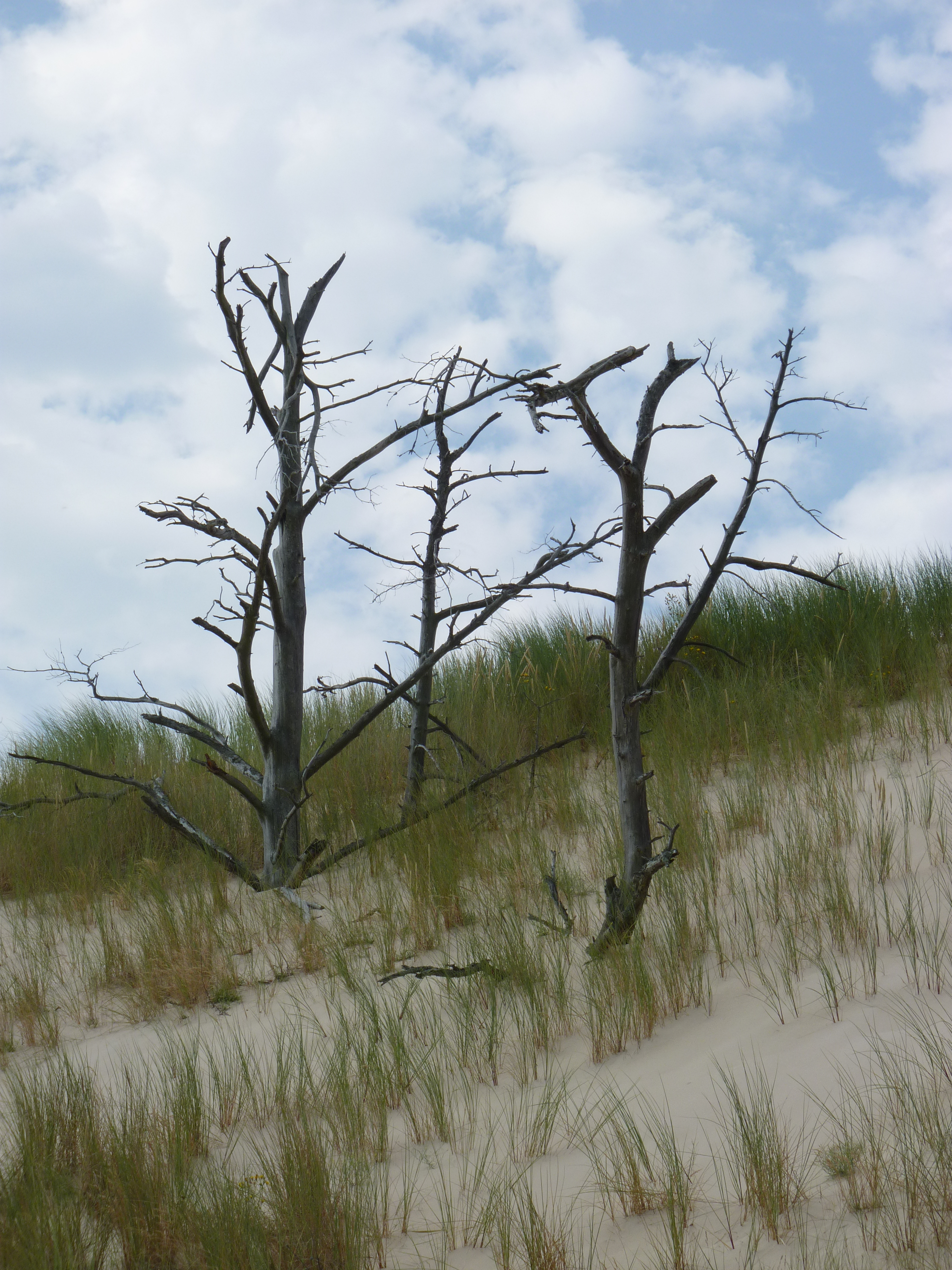
Dead trees

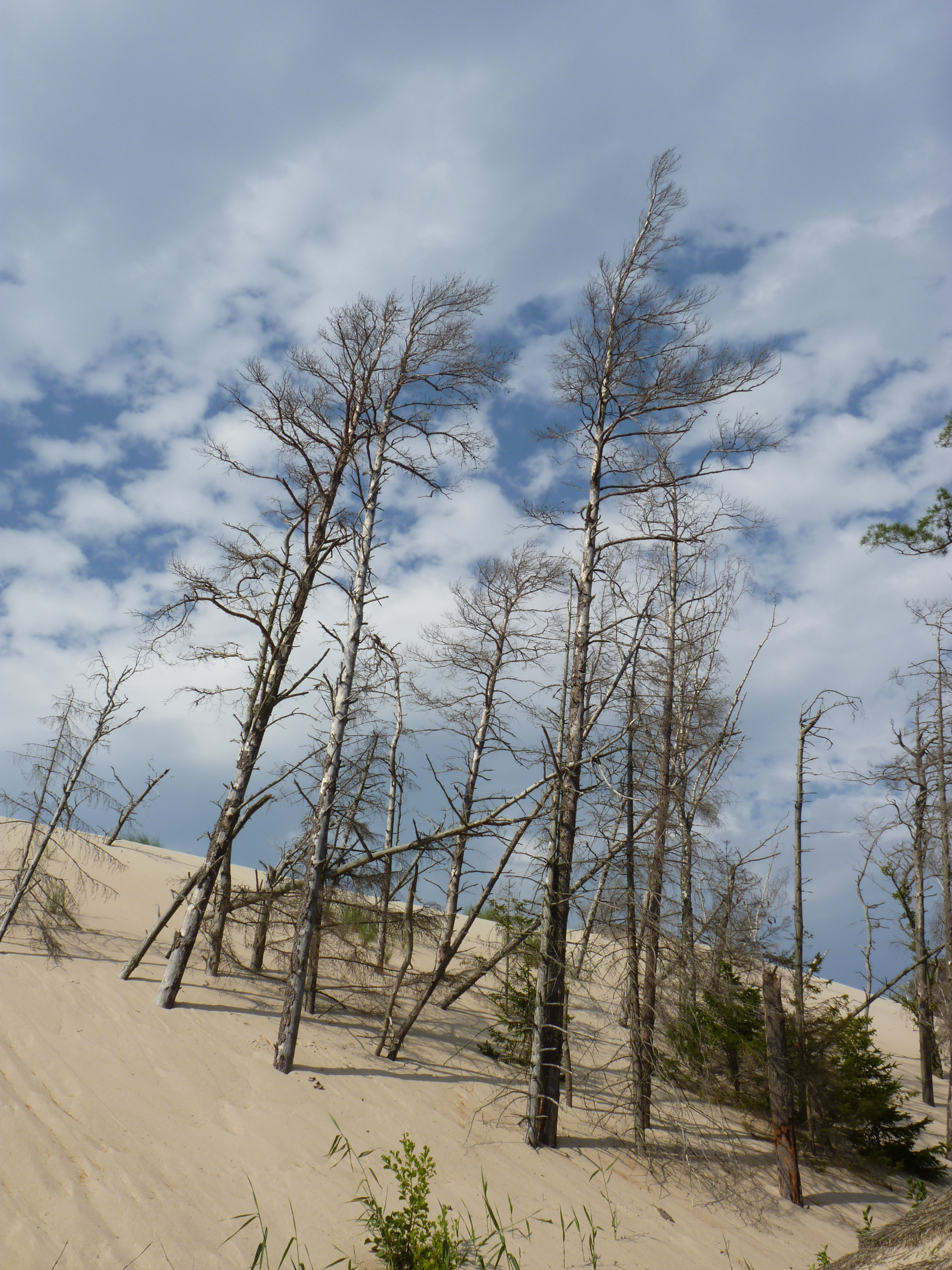
Dead trees

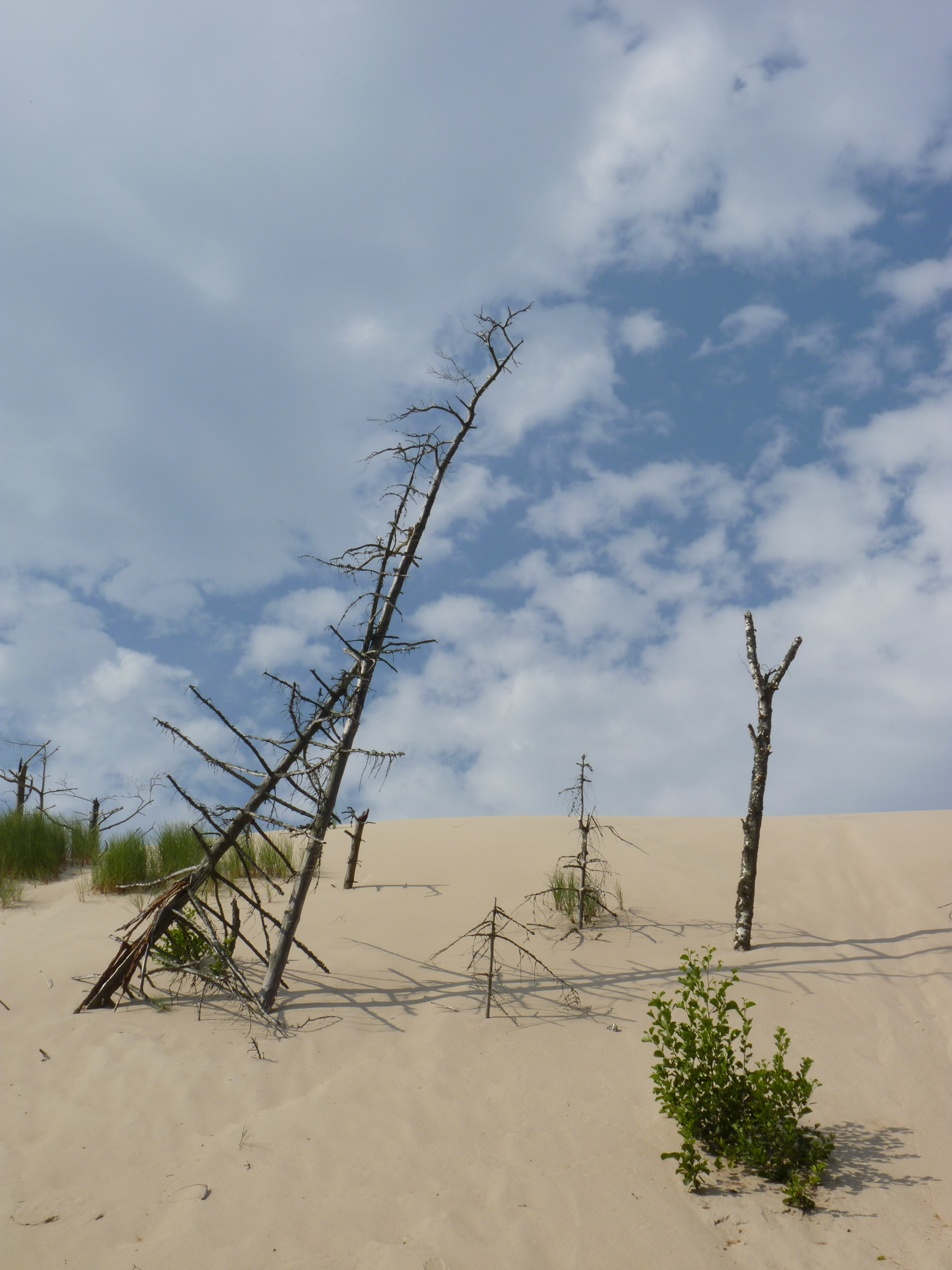
Dead trees

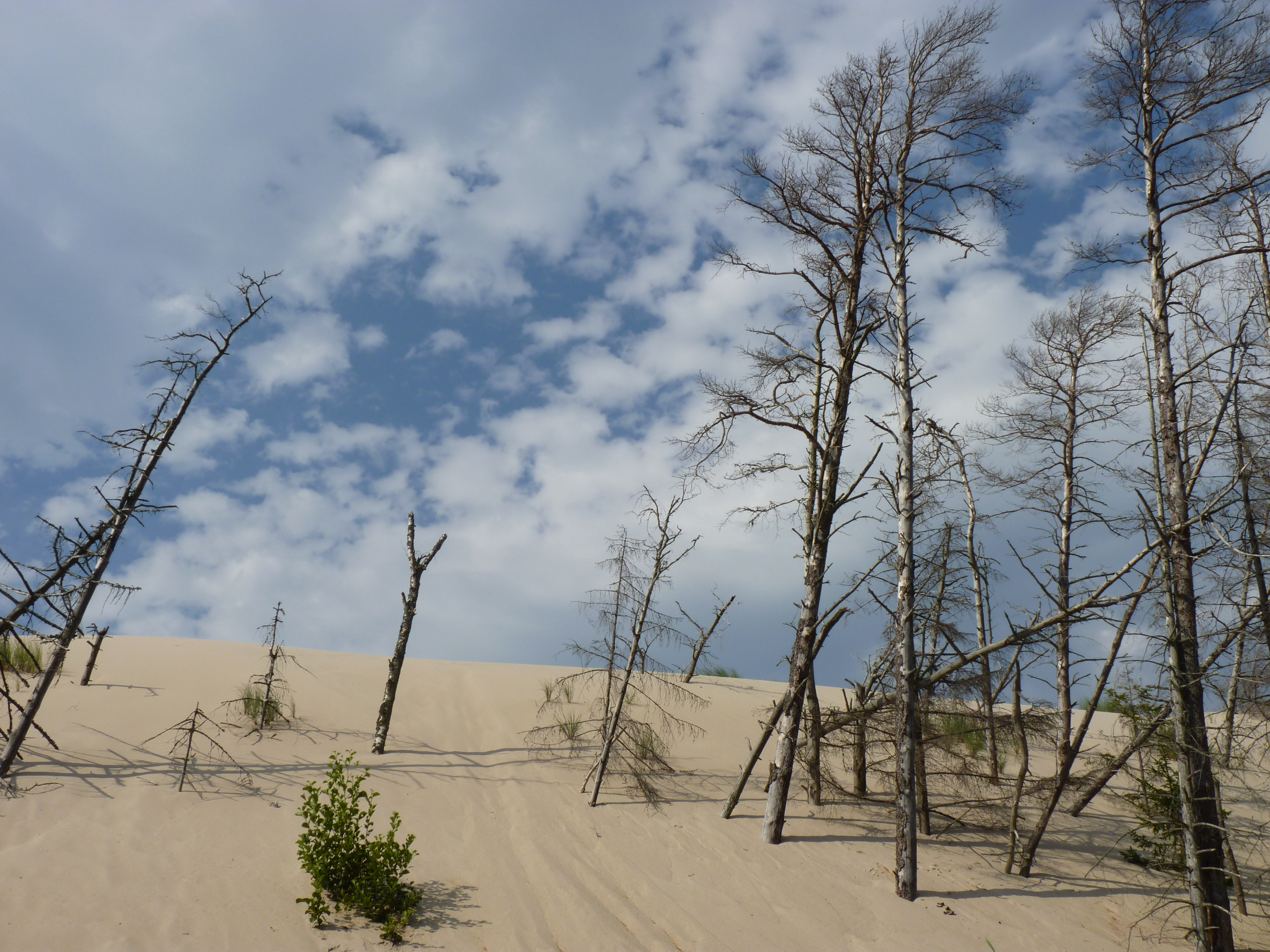
Dead trees

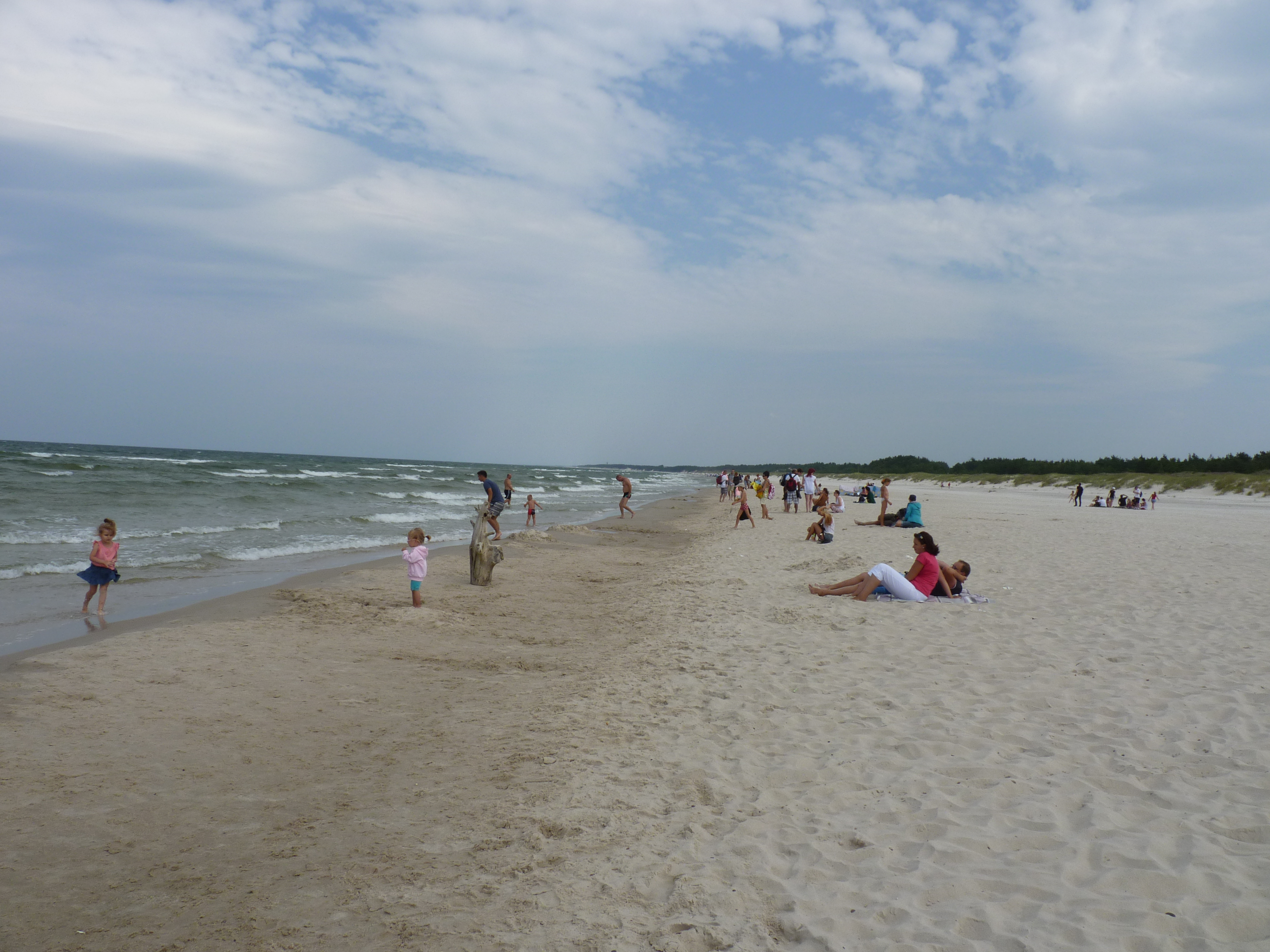
Beach, looking east

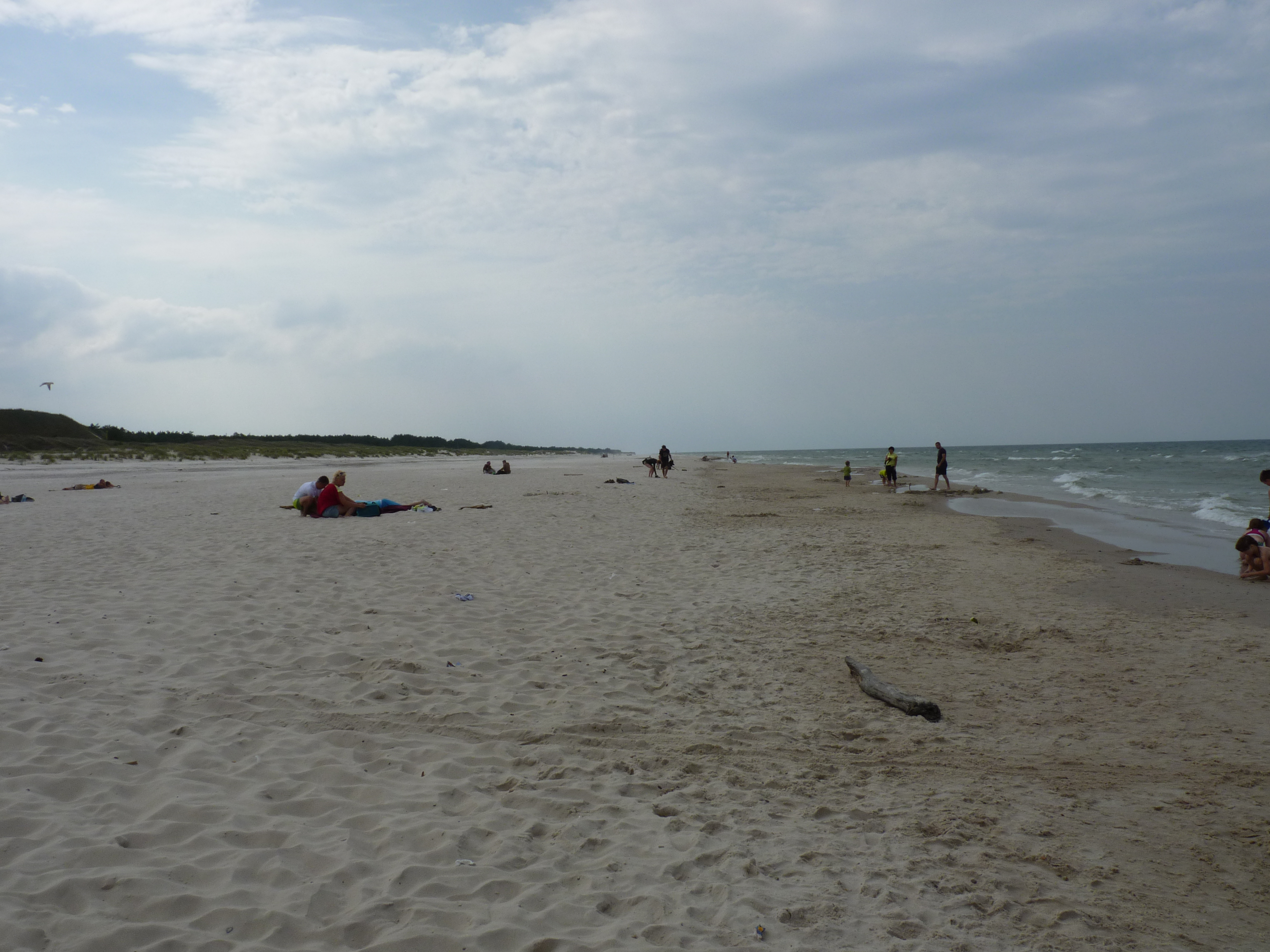
Beach, looking west

== See also ==
- Desert of Maine
