= Borzestowo =

Borzestowo Bòrzestowò
- Village
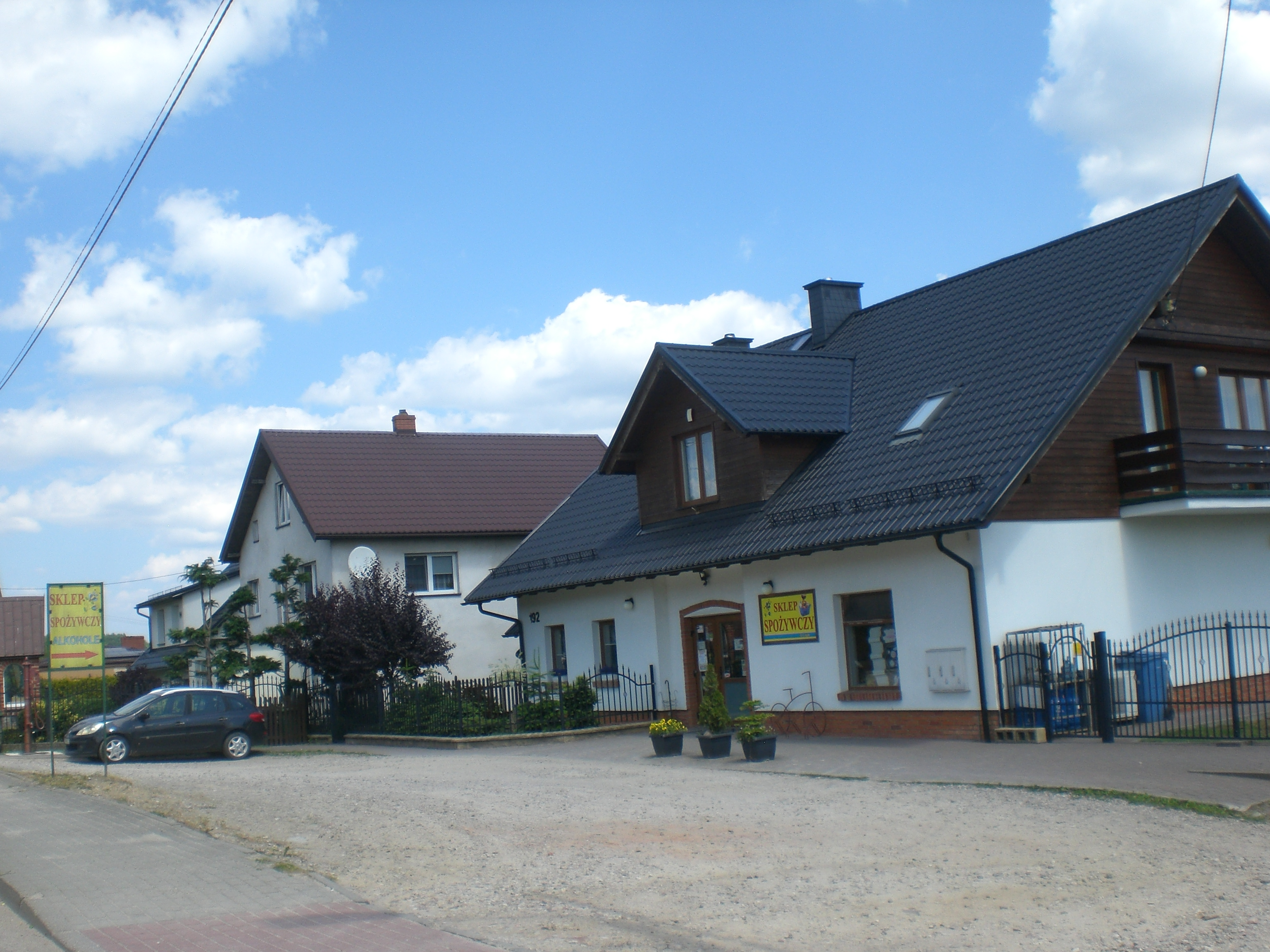

- Location within Poland
- Coordinates: 54°18′17″N 17°59′52″E
- Country: Poland
- Voivodeship: Pomeranian
- County: Kartuzy
- Gmina: Chmielno
- Elevation: 166.8 m (547 ft)
- Population: 559

Borzestowo [bɔʐɛˈstɔvɔ] (Kashubian: Bòrzestowò) is a village in the administrative district of Gmina Chmielno, within Kartuzy County, Pomeranian Voivodeship, in northern Poland.

For details of the history of the region, see History of Pomerania.
