= Łeba (river) =

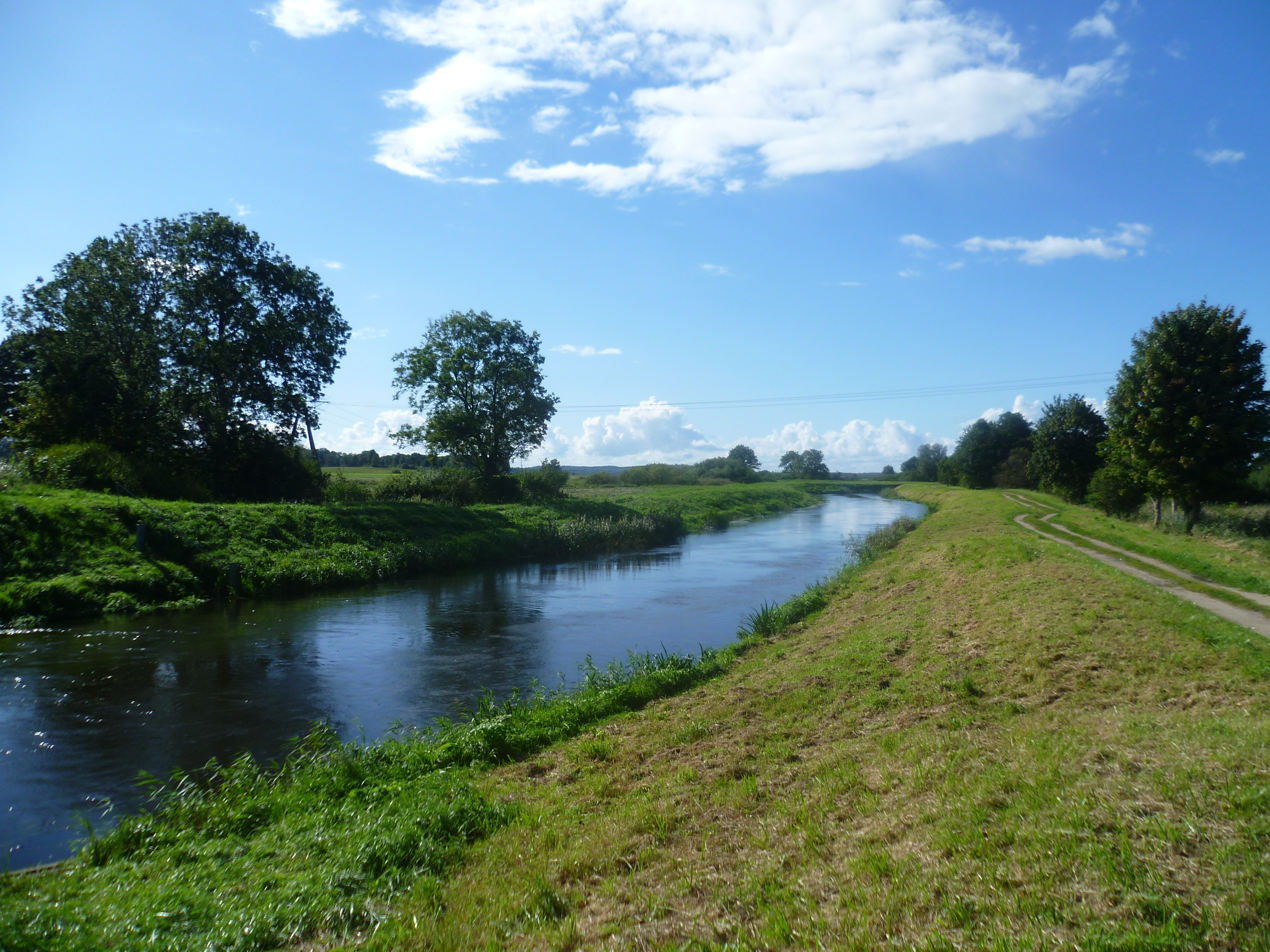

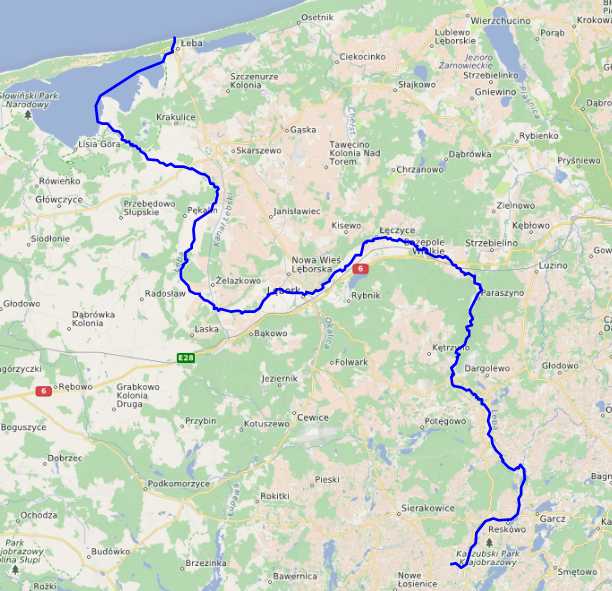

Location
- Country: Poland

Physical characteristics
- Source
  - location: Borzestowo near Kartuzy
  - elevation: 170 m (560 ft)
- Mouth
  - location: Baltic Sea at Łeba
  - coordinates: 54°46′3″N 17°33′2″E
- Length: 117 km (73 mi)
- Basin size: 1,801 km^{2} (695 sq mi)

The Łeba (German: Leba), a river in Middle Pomerania (Poland), originates near the village of Borzestowo west of Kartuzy, passes through Łebsko Lake and empties into the Baltic Sea. It is 117 km long with a basin area of 1,801 km².

The town of Lębork lies on the river Łeba, while the town of Łeba on the Baltic coast was originally located west of the present-day mouth of the river.

In the 12th century the lower Łeba marked the eastern border of the Land of Słupsk-Sławno, ruled by the Pomeranian (Griffin) duke Ratibor I and his descendants, while the territory around the castellany of Białogarda was a possession of the Pomerelian duke Sobieslaw I of the Samborides dynasty. After Poland regained Pomerelia in 1294, the Łeba formed the boundary between the Polish part of Pomerania and the Duchy of Pomerania. From 1308, after the Teutonic takeover of Danzig (Gdańsk) and the Treaty of Soldin (Myślibórz), the river formed the western border of the Order's Pomerelian lands with the Duchy of Pomerania until 1466, when Poland regained Pomerelia. From that time the mouth of the Łeba on the Baltic coast marked the north-easternmost point of the Holy Roman Empire till its dissolution in 1806. The adjacent Pomerelian lands of Lauenburg and Bütow (Lębork i Bytów) became a fief of the Polish Crown with the Second Peace of Thorn (1466).

== Sights ==
There is an abundance of architectural and natural attractions near Łeba, above all the Słowiński National Park with its moving sand dunes, about 8 km west of the city. Further objects of interest include:

- ruins of the Nikolaikirche (St. Nicholas church) west of the city on the way to the beach
- fishermen's church of 1683 with a painting by Max Pechstein
- fishermen's dwellings from the 19th century in Kosciuszki street
- the 19th century casino on Nadmorska street, today the Hotel Neptun
- former rocket test site near Pletka
- the dinosaur park south of the city
