= Łeba railway station =

Railway station in Poland

Łeba
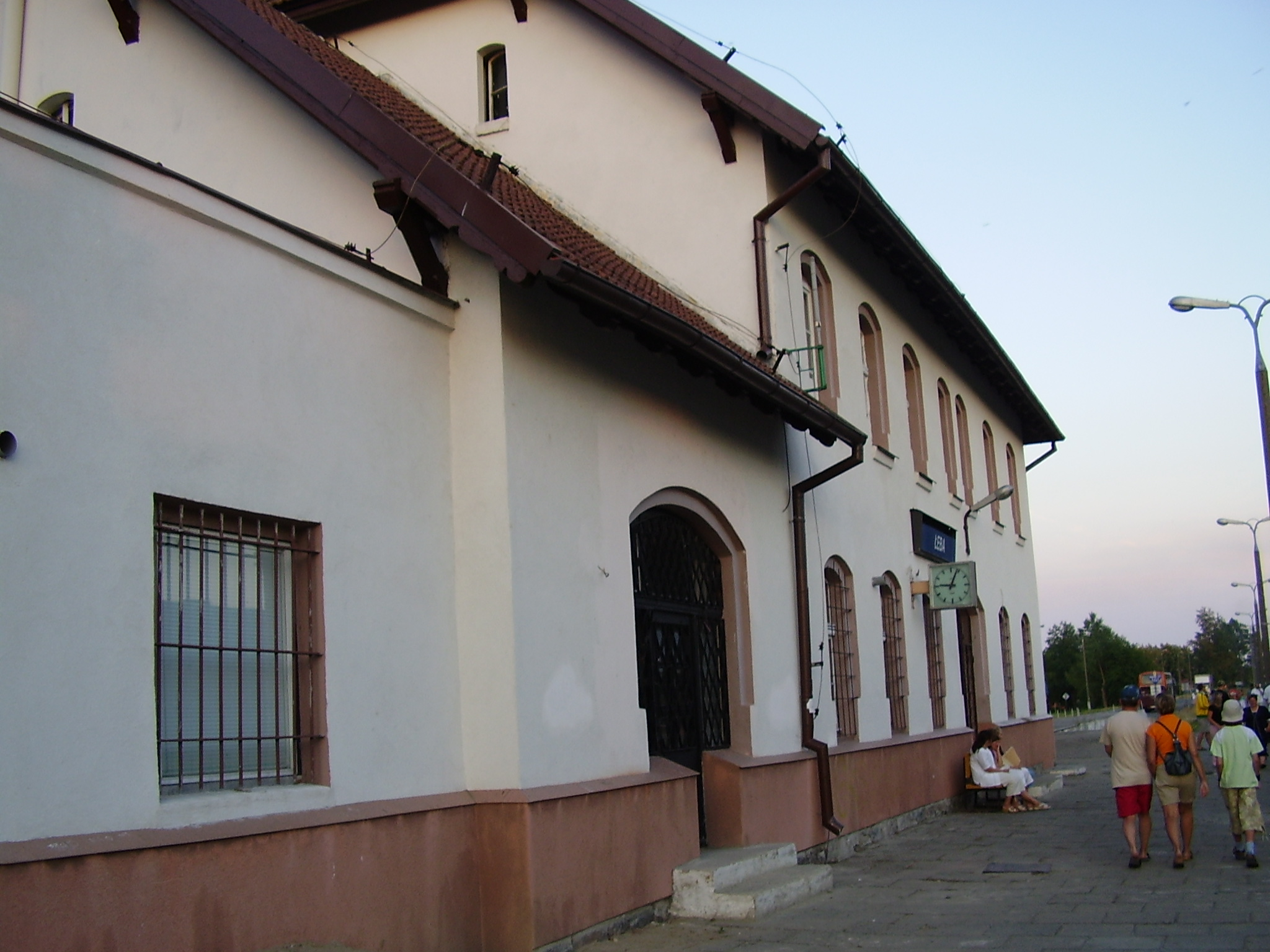

General information
- Location: Łeba; Poland
- Owner: Polskie Koleje Państwowe S.A.
- Platforms: 1

Construction
- Structure type: Building: Yes; Depot: Yes (no longer used); Water tower: Yes (no longer used)

History
- Former names: Łebno; Leba until 1945
Location

Łeba is a PKP railway station in Łeba (Pomeranian Voivodeship), Poland.

== Lines crossing the station ==
Start station	End station	Line type
Pruszcz Gdański	Łeba	Passenger/Freight
