= Łebsko Lake =

Lake in Żarnowska, Pomeranian Voivodeship, Poland

- German: Lebasee; Kashubian: Łebskò
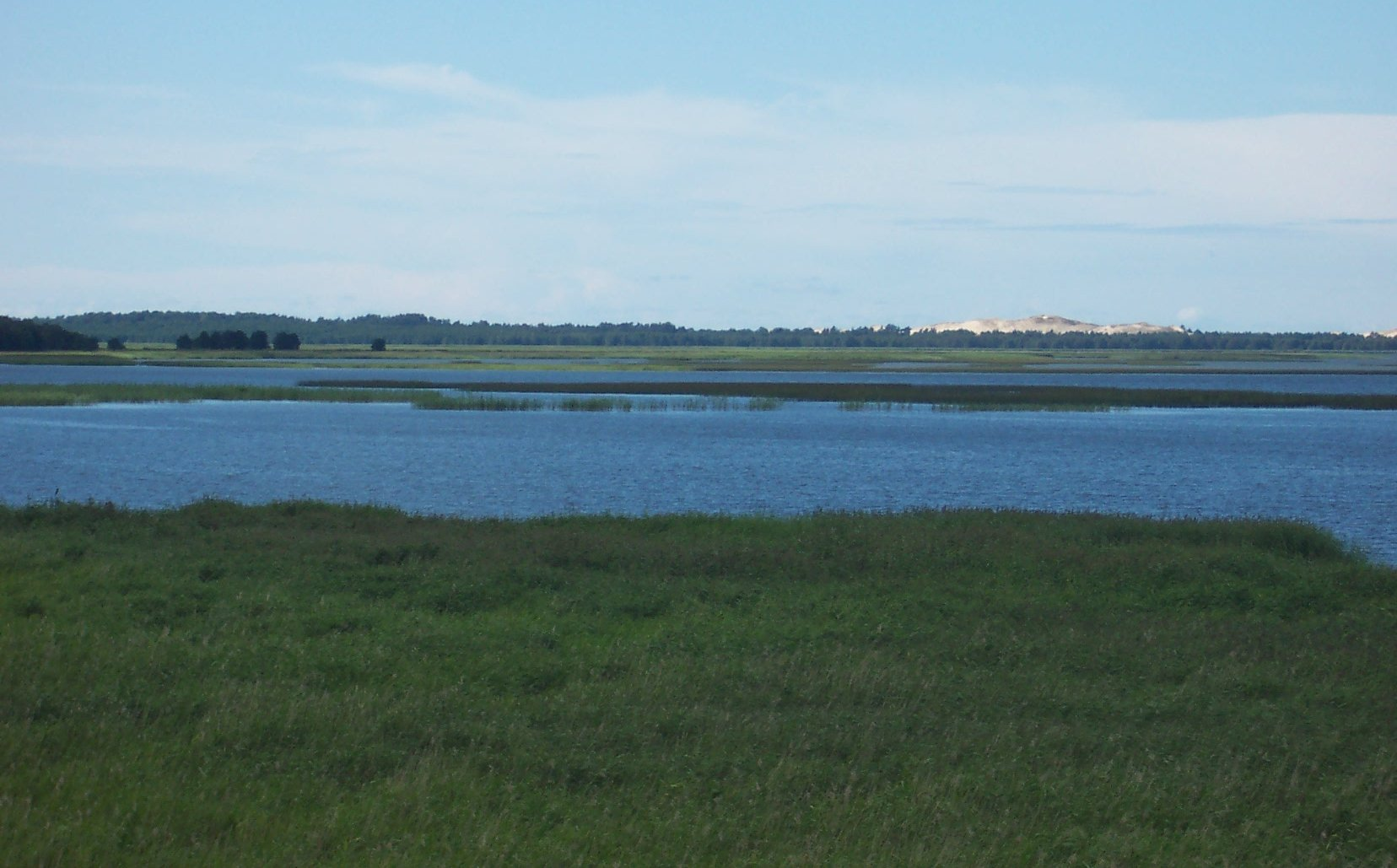
- Interactive map of Łebsko Lake
- Location: Slovincian National Park
- Coordinates: 54°42′49″N 17°24′32″E
- Type: Lake
- Primary inflows: Łeba, Pustynka
- Primary outflows: Łeba
- Basin countries: Poland
- Max. length: 16.4 km (10.2 mi)
- Max. width: 7.6 km (4.7 mi)
- Surface area: 71.4 km^{2} (27.6 mi^{2})
- Average depth: 1.6 m (5.2 ft)
- Max. depth: 6.3 m (21 ft)
- Water volume: 0.118 km^{3} (0.028 mi^{3})
- Shore length^{1}: 55.4 km (34.4 mi)
- Surface elevation: 0.3 m (0.98 ft)
- ^{1} Shore length is not a well-defined measure.

Łebsko Lake (Kashubian: Jezoro Łebsczo; Polish: Jezioro Łebsko) is a brackish coastal lake in the Pomeranian Voivodeship of Poland. It is connected to the Baltic Sea by the Łeba River, which causes saltwater intrusion. It is located within Słowiński National Park. The lake formed when sea winds pushed up a spit of sand that ultimately separated it from the Baltic sea. The town of Łeba sits where the Łeba river meets the sea.
