= Slovincian language =

Extinct West Slavic language

Slovincian
- slôvjinskjy jãzëk
- Native to: Poland, Germany
- Region: Pomerania
- Extinct: 20th century
- Language family: Indo-European: Balto-Slavic; Slavic; West Slavic; Lechitic; Pomeranian; Slovincian

Language codes
- ISO 639-3: –
- Glottolog: slov1270
- Linguasphere: 53-AAA-ca
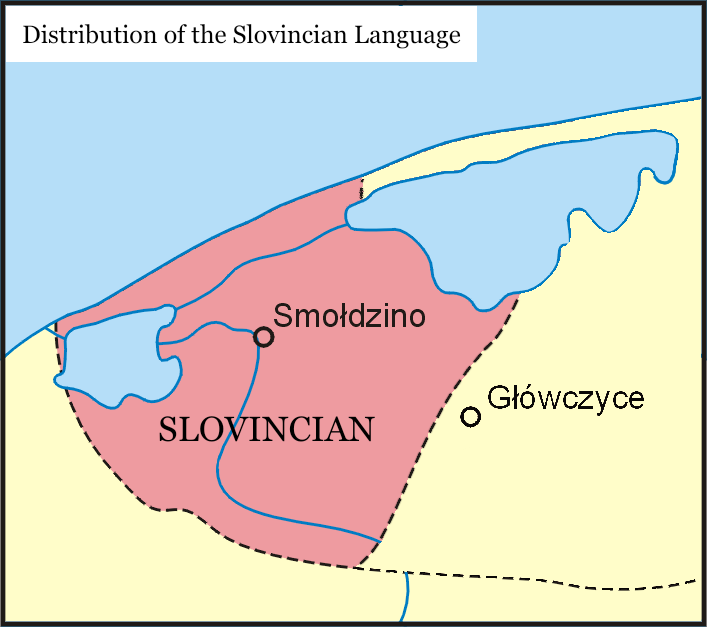
- The Slovincian ethnolect in the north west of the Kashubian region at the beginning of the 20th century

- Slovincian is an extinct language according to the classification system of the UNESCO Atlas of the World's Languages in Danger

Slovincian (Slovincian: slôvjinskjy, IPA: [slɵˈvjinskjɪ]; Polish: słowiński [swɔˈvij̃skʲi]; Kashubian: słowińsczi [swɔˈviɲst͡ɕi]; German: Slowinzisch) was a Lechitic language formerly spoken by the Slovincians living between lakes Gardno and Łebsko near Słupsk in Pomerania.

Slovincian is classified either as a language (first by Friedrich Lorentz), or as a Kashubian dialect or variant. Slovincian and Kashubian are both classified as Pomeranian. See below.

Slovincian became extinct in the early twentieth century ultimately due to stigmatization from Germans. However, individual words and expressions survived until after World War II, when the region became Polish. Some Slovincians were expelled along with the Germans. Of those allowed to stay, a few elderly people had fragmentary knowledge of Slovincian until the 1950s.

It is disputed whether Slovincians actually used that name, given to them by the Russian academic Aleksander Hilferding, for themselves. The synonym Lebakaschuben (Łebsko Kashubians) is also used. Some scholars believe that Slovincians regarded themselves merely as Lutheran Kashubians and their language as Kashubian. Nevertheless, the name "Slovincian" prevails in literature and is also used officially, for example in Słowiński Park Narodowy (Slovincian National Park), a protected area on the Polish Pomeranian coast.

== Transcription ==
Because Slovincian was never a written language, many different notation systems have been used in dictionaries and grammars of this language. This article will use a modified Kashubian orthography designed with northern dialects in mind used by some authors. Things such as voicing assimilation will not be accounted for to maintain an etymological spelling, as also such assimilation is predictable.

Slovincian transcription
Majuscule forms
| A | Ã | E | É | Ë | Ê | I | O | Ó | Õ | Ô | U | Ú | Ù | Y | B | C | D | F | G | J | K | L | M | N | Ń | P | R | S | T | W | Z | Ż |
Minuscule forms
| a | ã | e | é | ë | ê | i | o | ó | õ | ô | u | ú | ù | y | b | c | d | f | g | j | k | l | m | n | ń | p | r | s | t | w | z | ż |
Phonetic realizations in IPA
| a | ã | ɛ ə (Note: unaccented word-finally) | e | ə | i̯ɛ (Note: accented) ɛ (Note: unaccented) ə | i | ɔ | o | õ | ɵ | u | ʉ | y | ɪ | b | t͡s | d | f | ɡ | j | k | l | m | n (Note: only alternates with nj in some declensions, otherwise no alternation occurs) | n (Note: used word-finally and before some consonants; alternates with ⟨nj⟩ in declensions) | p | r | s | t | v | z | ʒ |

Digraphs
Majuscule forms
| CH | CZ | DZ | DŻ | GH | RZ | SZ |
Minuscule forms
| ch | cz | dz | dż | gh | rz | sz |
Phonetic realizations in IPA
| x | t͡ʃ | d͡z | d͡ʒ | ɣ | r̝ | ʃ |

Additionally, breve ⟨˘⟩ is used for short vowels that appear in some loanwords, and macron ⟨¯⟩ is used to indicate length in one set of words. Stress is marked with ⟨ˈ⟩.

== Phonology ==
Slovincian vowels
| | Front | Central | Back |
|---|---|---|---|
| Close | i, y ĭ, (Note: loan phoneme.) y̆ | ʉ | ŭ |
| Near-close | ɪ | | |
| Close-mid | e | ɵ | o, õ |
| Open-mid | ɛ | ə | ɔ ɔ̆ |
| Open | | a, ã ă ā (Note: only occurs in unstressed position in compounds of monosyllabic verbs.) | |

Slovincian consonants
| | | Labial | Dental/ alveolar | Post- alveolar | Palatal | Velar |
|---|---|---|---|---|---|---|
| Nasal | | m | n | | | |
| Plosive | voiceless | p | t | | | k |
| Plosive | voiced | b | d | | | ɡ |
| Affricate | voiceless | | t͡s | t͡ʃ | | |
| Affricate | voiced | | d͡z | d͡ʒ | | |
| Fricative | voiceless | f | s | ʃ | | x |
| Fricative | voiced | v | z | ʒ | | (ɣ) |
| Vibrant | | | r | r̝ | | |
| Approximant | | | l | | j | |

=== Vowel length, pitch, and stress ===
Slovincian native vowels do not show any phonemic difference in length except in one set of words; however, loanwords show unpredictability as to whether the given vowel will be long or short, giving a series of long or short loan-phonemes, existing only in loanwords.

It was originally posited that Slovincian had pitch, but it was later shown to be entirely dependent on stress, and thus, non-phonemic. However, stress itself is phonemic and can appear on any syllable. There is a tendency to place the accent on the first syllable in polysyllabic stems, especially in noun inflections and, more rarely, in verbal inflections.

=== Notable allophony and other phonetic processes ===
Unstressed word-final ⟨e⟩ has an archiphoneme of ⟨ë⟩. The pronouns tewa, jewa, czewa, njewa, etc., are subject to irregular phonetic reduction and can be realized with either ⟨ë⟩ or ⟨e⟩, with an ultimate underlying ⟨e⟩.

⟨ë⟩ is phonemically /ə/; regionally, it may be [æ].

⟨o⟩ can be realized as a diphthong [ɔu̯] when stressed in open medial syllables, and in closed syllables and ultima.

⟨ó⟩ can be a diphthong [ou̯] when stressed. [ou̯] and [o] are neutralized to /o/ in unstressed position before ⟨r⟩ and ⟨rz⟩.

Diphthongs or triphthongs whose elements end in ⟨j⟩ or ⟨ù⟩ will never have a diphthongized first element, even when stressed.

Some numerals show an irregular positional lengthening of ⟨y⟩ before word-final ⟨-nc⟩, represented as /i/.

It has been claimed that ⟨y⟩ and ⟨i⟩ are allophones appearing after hard or soft consonants, respectively; however, minimal pairs exist, for example:

wëbjijã ("to knock out") (first person singular future) vs. wëbjyjã (first person singular present)

The distinction between the two is neutralized after all consonants word-finally except after ⟨j, s, z, cz, dż⟩.

⟨ô⟩ can be diphthongized to [ʉɵ] when stressed and realized as [ɵ] when unstressed. /ɵ/ can optionally be stressed in a few monosyllabic, common words, resulting from a reduction due to rapid speech and frequent use.

⟨e⟩ diphthongizes to [ɛj] when stressed.

⟨é⟩ diphthongizes to [ej] when stressed except word-finally, where it remains phonetic /ej/.

⟨ó⟩ is the archiphoneme of ⟨o⟩ and ⟨ó⟩ before ⟨i⟩.

Nasal vowels can lose nasality when in coda position and unstressed.

⟨a⟩ before nasal consonants and when stressed has an allophone ⟨ã⟩, and becomes [ã] again in the same position when unstressed as an alternative, non-phonemic pronunciation.

⟨o⟩ also can undergo non-phonemic nasalization to ⟨õ⟩ in the same position.

In Kluki, all vowels in such position could non-phonemically nasalize. Proclitics do not affect nasality.

Regionally, ⟨v⟩ and ⟨f⟩ can allophonically be [w] and [ʍ] in word-final position.

⟨j⟩ has an allophone [xʲ] after /p/.

Slovincian displays a voicing assimilation system similar to the one found in Polish.

⟨kj⟩, ⟨gj⟩, ⟨chj⟩, and ⟨ghj⟩ can be phonetically realized as [c͡ç], [ɟ͡ʝ], [ç], and [ʝ], respectively.

Certain affixes can cause secondary stress (and, in some cases, secondary stress causes the appearance of non-phonemic diphthongs).

== Development from Proto-Slavic ==
Slovincian shares many similar developments as Kashubian, with some notable differences being:

Long *a, often from being with a tautosyllabic voiced consonants, became <o> usually and <ó> (via <o>) before nasals. Otherwise, *a remained <a>.

- *drapatь > drapac ("to scratch")
- *gradъ > gr'od ("hail")
- *gъpanъ > pón ("lord")
- a before tautosyllabic *r (*ar) > <or>.
- *darъ > dor
- a before tautosyllabic *l, ľ > <ôù> (where *l and *ľ merged).
- valъ > vôùl
- a before tautosyllabic *j> ôj medially and > ôù finally
- *ajьko > jôjkô
- <v> from earlier *v and *v́ before a consonant and in the coda is lost between u̯ and a pause.
- *pravьda > prôùda

Long Proto-Slavic *u fronts to <ú>. Initial *u also has a prothetic <w> inserted.

- *učiti > wùczic

Short Proto-Slavic *o fronts to <ô>. Initial *o also has a prothetic <w> inserted. Short o raises to <ó> before liquids.

- *okъno > wôknô

Proto-Slavic *e shifts to <ê> (which diphthongizes when stressed).

- *teplъ > cêply

Proto-Slavic *ň hardens to <nj> (/nj/) medially and initially, and becomes /n/ finally. For the spelling of <ń>, see the transcription of Slovinician

- *ničьto > njic
- *koňь > kóń (pronounced /ˈkon/).

A lack of further palatalization of soft *k and *g.

- *kortъ̀kъ > krótkjy
- *dȏrgъ > drôgjy

Bëlaczenié.

- *ablo > jablô

Numerous other changes exist, usually occurring within individual words. A retention of the dual.

- ˈbrzég ("coast") > ˈbrzêgji ("two coasts")

A reduction of the suffix -ôwac (From *-ovati) to -ac.

- daˈrôwac||daˈrac

== Grammar ==
Slovincian grammar displays typical Slavic features, including declinable nouns, adjectives, verbs, pronouns, and numerals, as well as comparative and superlative forms, but notably retains a dual number. Many of its grammatical endings differ from those in Kashubian.

== History ==
The ancestors of the Slovincians, the West Slavic Pomeranians, moved in after the Migration Period. Following the Ostsiedlung, the Slovincians, like most of the other Wends, gradually became Germanized. The adoption of Lutheranism in the Duchy of Pomerania in 1534 distinguished the Slovincians from the Kashubes in Pomerelia, who remained Roman Catholic. In the 16th century, "Slovincian" was also applied to the Slavic speakers in the Bytów (Bütow) region further south.

In the 16th and 17th century, Michael Brüggemann (also known as Pontanus or Michał Mostnik), Simon Krofey (Szimon Krofej), and J.M. Sporgius introduced Kashubian into the Lutheran Church. Krofey, pastor in Bytów (Bütow), published a religious song book in 1586, written in Polish but also containing some Kashubian words. Brüggemann, pastor in Schmolsin, published a Polish translation of some works of Martin Luther and biblical texts, also containing Kashubian elements. Other biblical texts were published in 1700 by Sporgius, pastor in Schmolsin. His Schmolsiner Perikopen, most of which is written in the same Polish-Kashubian style of Krofey's and Brüggemann's books, also contain small passages ("6th Sunday after Epiphanias") written in pure Kashubian.

Hilferding (1862) and Parczewski (1896) confirmed a progressive language shift in the Kashubian population from their Slavonic vernacular to the local West-Germanic dialect (Low German Ostpommersch or High German, in eastern Kashubian areas also Low German Low Prussian).

By the 1920s, the Slovincian villages had become linguistically Germanic, though a Slovincian consciousness remained. The area remained within the borders of Germany until becoming part of Poland after World War II ended in 1945 and the area became Polish. Some Slovincians were expelled along with the German population, some were allowed to remain. In the 1950s, mainly in the village of Kluki (formerly Klucken), a few elderly people still remembered fragments of Slovincian.

Slovincians began to ask for the right to emigrate to West Germany, and virtually all of the remaining Slovincian families had emigrated there by the 1980s.

== Dialects ==
Slovincian can be divided into two major dialects, East and West, each with subdialects, with a third transitional dialect. The dialect in Kluki is often considered the main form of Slovincian, as it was the longest to continue to speak Slovincian.

The eastern dialect stretches from Smołdzino to Stojcino.

The western dialect includes the territory by Lake Gardno (Gardna Wielka and Gardna Mała) excluding Stojcino, as Stojcino had more economic and religious ties with Smołdzino.

Major differences between East and West include:

1. the Proto-Slavic vowels *i, *y, *u, *ę after hard consonants (and after ⟨c, dz⟩ in the West) became [æ] in the East and [ɛ] in the West, phonemically ⟨ë⟩ /ə/;
2. Slovincian diphthongs ⟨ê⟩ [ɪɛ] and ⟨ô⟩ [ʉɵ] are monophthongized before nasals in stressed syllables in Western Slovincian and preserved as diphthongs in Eastern;
3. in the dative singular masculine, Eastern Slovincian has the endings ⟨-ojú⟩ or ⟨-ejú⟩, whereas the West Slovincian has the endings ⟨-ôjú⟩ and ⟨-ejú⟩.

Eastern has the subdialects of:

1. Smołdzino and Żeleskie (Kluki Żeleskie), which has the following features: Proto-Slavic ǫ is preserved in every position, nasalization of the diphthongs ⟨ó⟩ [ou] and ⟨o⟩ [ɑu] in stressed syllables before nasal consonants, /v, f/ can be pronounced as [w, ʍ], universal retention of softness in ⟨czwj⟩ (e.g. czwjardi from *tvьrdъ (compare Polish twardy)), and verbs of class III2D (first person ⟨-újã⟩) are formed not only from the stem ⟨-aja-⟩ but also ⟨-owa-⟩;
2. Smołdziński Las and Czołpino, characterized by the fact that the syllable-final labiodental ⟨v, f⟩ can be pronounced as [w, ʍ] after [ou];
3. Stojcino, where ⟨õ⟩ can be pronounced as [ou] in initial position and stressed final position, but remains [oũ] in unstressed final position, and all vowels and diphthongs are realized as weakly nasalized in stressed syllables before nasals.

Western has the subdialects of:

1. Gardna Wielka, where [ʉɵ] can be pronounced as [ʉ], ⟨e⟩ and ⟨ô⟩ have become [i] and [ʉ] in unstressed syllables before nasals, and [ɪɛ] and [ʉɵ] can be pronounced as [i] and [ʉ] before ⟨rsz⟩;
2. Gardna Mała, where [ɛ] is [i] in unstressed syllables before nasals after soft consonants;
3. Wysoka, Retowo, Łódki, Czysta, and the historic Blottken (now part of Wysoka, coordinates: 54.633611,17.143906), where the vowels [ʉ] and [ɵ] have become [u] and [o], and the diphthongs [ʉɵ] and [ɵʉ] correspond here to [uo] and [ou], and [ɛ] has become [i] in unstressed syllables before nasals after soft consonants.

There existed a dialect in Rowy, extinct already in the 19th century, some of whose toponyms have been preserved.

Stowięcino has a transitional subdialect between East and West. Lorentz claims that [a] here is more back than in Kluki, while Rudnicki claims it is more front.

The use of ⟨-aja-⟩ and ⟨-owa-⟩ for ⟨-owac⟩ verbs could have been common to all three villages, but might have been absent in Witkowo.

== Classification ==
Lorentz points to shared features between Slovincian and Kashubian such as ⟨ë⟩ for old short *i, *y, *u, and Kashubization pointed to five features distinguishing Slovincian as a language distinct from Kashubian:

1. the diphthongization of Proto-Slavic *o > Kashubian ⟨ò⟩ after labial and velar consonants is ⟨ô⟩ in Slovincian;
2. Kashubian ⟨wò, wù⟩ are pronounced /we, wu/, whereas ⟨w⟩ as /v/ is retained in Slovincian;
3. ⟨w⟩, which is always used as a spirant in the final syllable in Kashubian, has become a semi-vowel in Slovincian after ⟨o, ó, ú⟩;
4. Slovincian, like Polabian, underwent bylaczenie, unlike Kashubian; Lorentz also posits a retention of hard ⟨ł⟩ in some positions, making this a partial merger;
5. Slovincian treats class III2C verbs (first person singular ⟨-újã⟩) differently than Kashubian.

Nitsch made the following counterarguments to each point:

1. the first difference is about as large as some differences between standard Polish and dialects of Polish;
2. the second difference is also small;
3. this is not a shift of /v/ to a semivowel in some positions but rather a loss of /v/ between the semivowel /u̯/ and a pause;
4. this is not partial bylaczenie but rather there was a loss of *l in similar positions as *v, and all other remaining *l merged with *ľ;
5. this difference is a neologism created in Slovincian but is ultimately minor.

Since then, most scholars have classified Slovincian as a dialect of Kashubian, or as a close relative in a Pomeranian family.

== See also ==
- Kashubian language
- Polabian language

== Bibliography ==
- Mikkola, Jooseppi Julius (1897). К изучению кашубских говоров: Нѣсколько замѣток по кашубским говорам в сѣверо-восточной Померании. Императорская академия наук.
- Lorentz, Friedrich (1903). Slovinzische Grammatik.
- Lorentz, Friedrich (1905). Slovinzische Texte.
- Lorentz, Friedrich (1908). Slowinzisches Wörterbuch: zweiter Teil. Vol. 1, A–O. St. Petersburg: Buchdruckerei der Kaiserlichen Akademie der Wissenschaften.
- Nitsch, Kazimierz (1908). Łoś, Jan; Mańkowski, Leon; Rozwadowski, Jan (eds.). "Slovinzische Grammatik" [Slovincian Grammar]. Rocznik Slawistyczny (in Polish). 1. Krakow: Gebethner i Spółka: 121–130.
- Kazimierz, Nitsch (1909). Łoś, Jan; Mańkowski, Leon; Rozwadowski, Jan (eds.). "Slowinzisches Wörterbuch" [Slovincian Dictionary]. Rocznik Slawistyczny (in Polish). 2. Krakow: Gebethner i Spółka: 43–56.
- Lorentz, Friedrich (1912). Slowinzisches Wörterbuch: zweiter Teil. Vol. 2, P–Z. St. Petersburg: Buchdruckerei der Kaiserlichen Akademie der Wissenschaften.
- Rudnicki, Mikołaj (1913). "Przyczynki do gramatyki i słownika narzecza słowińskiego". Materyały i Prace Komisyi językowej. IV. Kraków.
- Stokhof, W.A.L. (1973). The Extinct East-Slovincian Kluki-Dialect, Phonology and Morphology. The Hague: Mouton.
- Sobierajski, Zenon; Trawińska, Maria (1997). Słownik gwarowy tzw. Słowińców kaszubskich. Vol. 1, A–C (1 ed.). Warsaw: Sławistyczny ośrodek wydawniczy.
- Bethin, Christina Yurkiw (1998). Slavic Prosody: Language Change and Phonological Theory. Cambridge University Press. ISBN 0-521-59148-1.
- Stankiewicz, Edward (1993). The Accentual Patterns of the Slavic Languages. Stanford University Press. ISBN 0-8047-2029-0.
- Hulst, Harry; Bossong, Georg (1999). Eurotyp. Walter de Gruyter. ISBN 3-11-015750-0.
- Gilbers, Dicky; Nerbonne, John A.; Schaeken, J. (2000). Languages in Contact. Rodopi. ISBN 90-420-1322-2.
- Comrie, Bernard; Corbett, Greville G. (2002). The Slavonic languages. Taylor & Francis. p. 762. ISBN 0-415-28078-8.
- Sussex, Roland; Cubberley, Paul (2006). The Slavic Language. Cambridge University Press. ISBN 0-521-22315-6.
