= Siecie railway station =

Railway station in Siecie, Poland

Siecie

General information
- Location: Siecie; Poland
- Owner: Polskie Koleje Państwowe S.A.
- Platforms: None

Construction
- Structure type: Building: No; Depot: No; Water tower: No

History
- Former names: Zietzen
Location

Siecie is a non-operational PKP railway station in Siecie (Pomeranian Voivodeship), Poland.

== Lines crossing the station ==
Start station	End station	Line type
Komnino	Siecie-Wierzchocino	Dismantled
