= Czysta railway station =

Railway station in Poland

Coordinates: 54.6258°N 17.1428°E

Czysta

General information
- Location: Czysta; Poland
- Owner: Polskie Koleje Państwowe S.A.
- Platforms: None

Construction
- Structure type: Building: No; Depot: No; Water tower: No

History
- Former names: Wittbeck
Location
- Location within Pomeranian Voivodeship Location within Poland

Czysta is a non-operational PKP railway station in Czysta (Pomeranian Voivodeship), Poland.

== Lines crossing the station ==
Start station	End station	Line type
Komnino	Siecie-Wierzchocino	Dismantled
