= Zelazo =

Zelazo may refer to:

== Places ==
- Żelazo, Łódź Voivodeship, a village in central Poland
- Żelazo, Pomeranian Voivodeship, a village in northern Poland

== Other ==
- Zelazo (surname)
- Żelazo (PKP station), a non-operational railway station in Poland
- Helene Zelazo Center for the Performing Arts, at the University of Wisconsin–Milwaukee
