= Gardna Wielka railway station =

Railway station in Poland

Gardna Wielka

General information
- Location: Gardna Wielka; Poland
- Owner: Polskie Koleje Państwowe S.A.
- Platforms: None

Construction
- Structure type: Building: No; Depot: No; Water tower: No

History
- Former names: Großgarde
Location

Gardna Wielka is a non-operational PKP railway station in Gardna Wielka (Pomeranian Voivodeship), Poland.

== Lines crossing the station ==
Start station	End station	Line type
Komnino	Siecie-Wierzchocino	Dismantled
