= Stojcino railway station =

Railway station in Stojcino, Poland

Stojcino

General information
- Location: Stojcino; Poland
- Coordinates: 54.631373°N 17.188436°E
- Owner: Polskie Koleje Państwowe S.A.
- Platforms: None

Construction
- Structure type: Building: No; Depot: No; Water tower: No

History
- Former names: Stohentin
Location

Stojcino is a non-operational PKP railway station in Stojcino (Pomeranian Voivodeship), Poland.

== Lines crossing the station ==
Start station	End station	Line type
Komnino	Siecie-Wierzchocino	Dismantled
