= Smołdzino =

Smołdzino may refer to:

- Smołdzino, Kartuzy County, Poland
- Smołdzino, Słupsk County, Poland
