= Żelazo railway station =

Railway station in Pomeranian Voivodeship, Poland

Żelazo

General information
- Location: Żelazo; Poland
- Coordinates: 54.641508°N 17.237166°E
- Owner: Polskie Koleje Państwowe S.A.
- Platforms: None

Construction
- Structure type: Building: No; Depot: No; Water tower: No

History
- Former names: Selesen
Location

Żelazo is a non-operational PKP railway station in Żelazo (Pomeranian Voivodeship), Poland.

== Lines crossing the station ==
Start station	End station	Line type
Siecie-Wierzchocino	Smołdzino	Dismantled
