= Slovincian =

Slovincian may refer to:

- Slovincian language, an extinct Slavic language
- Slovincians, Slavic people in Poland
