= Żelkowo railway station =

Railway station in Żelkowo, Poland

Żelkowo

General information
- Location: Żelkowo; Poland
- Coordinates: 54.589374°N 17.211115°E
- Owner: Polskie Koleje Państwowe S.A.
- Platforms: None

Construction
- Structure type: Building: No; Depot: No; Water tower: No

History
- Former names: Schwerinsh; Wendisch Silkow
Location

Żelkowo is a non-operational PKP railway station in Żelkowo (Pomeranian Voivodeship), Poland.

== Lines crossing the station ==
Start station	End station	Line type
Słupsk	Cecenowo	Dismantled
Żelkowo	Siecie-Wierzchocino	Dismantled
