= Slovincians =

Subgroup of Kashubians

Slɵvjĩnstvɵ (Slovincian) Słowińcë (Kashubian) Słowińcy (Polish) Slowinzen (German)
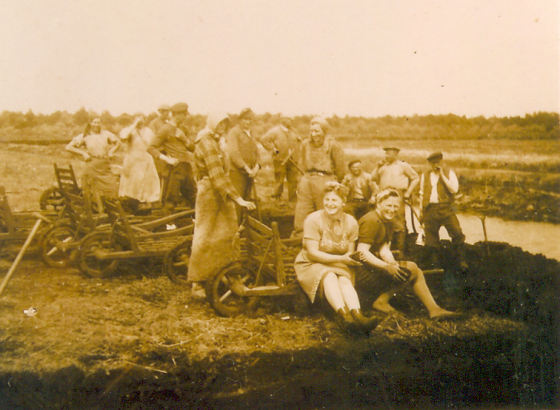
- Group of Slovincians

Regions with significant populations
- Poland (Pomeranian Voivodeship); Germany

Languages
- Kashubian, Polish (New mixed dialects), Low German (historically East Pomeranian), High German, Slovincian (historically)

Religion
- Lutheranism

Related ethnic groups
- Kashubians, Poles

Slovincians (Polish: Słowińcy), (Note: Slovincian: Slɵvjĩnstvɵ; Kashubian: Słowińcë; Polish: Słowińcy; German: Slowinzen, Slovinzen) also known as Łeba Kashubians, (Note: Polish: Kaszubi nadłebscy, Kaszubi łebscy; Kashubian: Kaszëbi nadłebsczi, Kaszëbi łebsczi; German: Lebakaschuben) is a near-extinct ethnic subgroup of the Kashubian people, who originated from the north western Kashubia, located in the Pomeranian Voivodeship, Poland, from the area around the lakes of Łebsko and Gardno. In the aftermath of World War II, Slovincians emigrated en masse to Germany, with the last families emigrating there in the 1980s. They originally spoke the Slovincian language, which went extinct in the early 20th century, as well as Kashubian, Polish, German and Low German.

== History ==
The ancestors of the Slovincians, the West Slavic Pomeranians, moved in after the Migration Period. Following the Ostsiedlung, the Slovincians like most of the other Wends gradually became Germanized. The adoption of Lutheranism in the Duchy of Pomerania in 1534 distinguished the Slovincians from the Kashubes in Pomerelia, who remained Roman Catholic. In the 16th century, "Slovincian" was also applied to the Slavic speakers in the Bytów (Bütow) region further south.

In the 16th and 17th centuries Michael Brüggemann (also known as Pontanus or Michał Mostnik), Simon Krofey (Szimon Krofej) and J.M. Sporgius introduced Kashubian into the Lutheran Church. Krofey, pastor in Bytów (Bütow), published a religious song book in 1586, written in Polish but also containing some Kashubian words. Brüggemann, pastor in Schmolsin, published a Polish translation of some works of Martin Luther and biblical texts, which also contained Kashubian elements. Other biblical texts were published in 1700 by Sporgius, pastor in Schmolsin. His Schmolsiner Perikopen, most of which is written in the same Polish-Kashubian style of Krofey's and Brüggemann's books, also contain small passages ("6th Sunday after Epiphanias") written in pure Kashubian.

Hilferding (1862) and Parczewski (1896) confirmed a progressive language shift in the Kashubian population from their Slavonic vernacular to the local West-Germanic dialect (Low German Ostpommersch or High German, in eastern Kashubian areas also to Low German Low Prussian).

By the 1920s, the Slovincian villages had become linguistically Germanic, though a Slovincian consciousness remained. The area remained within the borders of Germany until becoming part of Poland after World War II ended in 1945 and the area became Polish. Some Slovincians were expelled along with the German population, some were allowed to remain. In the 1950s, mainly in the village of Kluki (formerly Klucken), a few elderly people still remembered fragments of Slovincian.

The remaining Slovincians began to ask for the right to emigrate to West Germany, and virtually all of the remaining Slovincian families had emigrated there by the 1980s.
