= Bukowa =

Bukowa may refer to:

== Places ==
- Bukowa, Łódź Voivodeship (central Poland)
- Bukowa, Lublin Voivodeship (east Poland)
- Bukowa, Subcarpathian Voivodeship (south-east Poland)
- Bukowa, Staszów County in Świętokrzyskie Voivodeship (south-central Poland)
- Bukowa, Włoszczowa County in Świętokrzyskie Voivodeship (south-central Poland)
- Bukowa, Pomeranian Voivodeship (north Poland)

== Rivers ==
- Bukowa (Bug), left tributary of the Bug River
- Bukowa (Oder), left tributary of the West Oder
- Bukowa (Parsęta), tributary of the Parsęta
- Bukowa (San), left tributary of the San
