= Zelazo (surname) =

Zelazo is a Polish language surname, which means the metal "iron" in Polish. The name may refer to:

- Edward S. Zelazo (1924–2008), American politician
- Helen Zelazo (1920–1996), American philanthropist
- Nathaniel Zelazo (1918–2018), American businessman
- Philip David Zelazo (born 1966), American psychologist

== See also ==
- Zelazo (disambiguation)
