= Boleniec =

- Village
- Location within Poland
- Coordinates: 54°44′0″N 17°19′46″E
- Country: Poland
- Voivodeship: Pomeranian
- County: Słupsk
- Gmina: Smołdzino
- Population: 0
- Time zone: UTC+1 (CET)
  - Summer (DST): UTC+2 (CEST)

Boleniec [bɔˈlɛɲɛt͡s] (German: Bollenz) is a former village in the administrative district of Gmina Smołdzino, within Słupsk County, Pomeranian Voivodeship, in northern Poland.
