= Gmina Smołdzino =

Gmina Smołdzino Smołdzino Commune
- Gmina
- Coat of arms

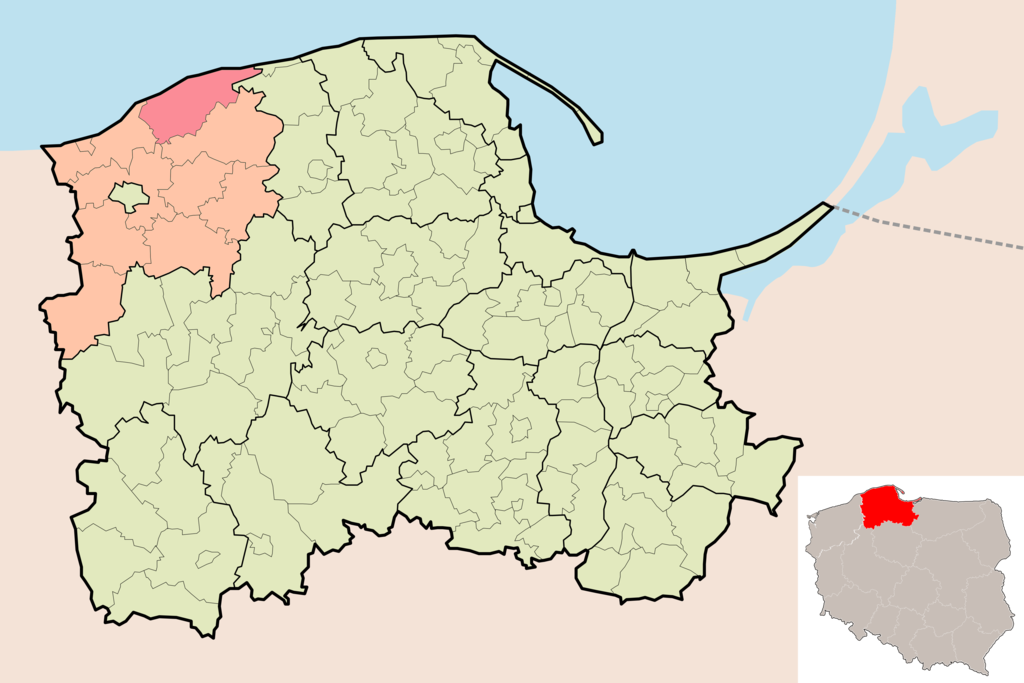
- Coordinates (Smołdzino): 54°39′48″N 17°12′49″E
- Country: Poland
- Voivodeship: Pomeranian
- County: Słupsk County
- Seat: Smołdzino

Area
  - Total: 257.24 km^{2} (99.32 sq mi)

Population (2006)
  - Total: 3,478
  - Density: 13.52/km^{2} (35.02/sq mi)
- Website: https://www.smoldzino.com.pl

Gmina Smołdzino is a rural gmina (administrative district) in Słupsk County, Pomeranian Voivodeship, in northern Poland. Its seat is the village of Smołdzino, which lies approximately 25 kilometres (16 mi) north-east of Słupsk and 98 km (61 mi) west of the regional capital Gdańsk.

The gmina covers an area of 257.24 square kilometres (99.3 sq mi), and as of 2006 its total population is 3,478.

== Villages ==
Gmina Smołdzino contains the villages and settlements of Boleniec, Bukowa, Człuchy, Czołpino, Czysta, Gardna Mała, Gardna Wielka, Kluki, Komnino, Łódki, Łokciowe, Przybynin, Retowo, Siecie, Siedliszcze, Smołdzino, Smołdziński Las, Stare Kluki, Stojcino, Wierzchocino, Witkowo, Wysoka and Żelazo.

== Neighbouring gminas ==
Gmina Smołdzino is bordered by the town of Łeba and by the gminas of Główczyce, Słupsk, Ustka and Wicko.
