= Smołdzino railway station =

Railway station in Słupsk County, Poland

Smołdzino

General information
- Location: Smołdzino; Poland
- Coordinates: 54.660529°N 17.220436°E
- Owner: Polskie Koleje Państwowe S.A.
- Platforms: None

Construction
- Structure type: Building: No; Depot: No; Water tower: No

History
- Former names: Schmolsin
Location

Smołdzino is a non-operational PKP railway station in Smołdzino (Pomeranian Voivodeship), Poland.

== Lines crossing the station ==
Start station	End station	Line type
Siecie-Wierzchocino	Smołdzino	Dismantled
