= Łokciowe =

- Village
- Location within Poland
- Coordinates: 54°41′14″N 17°16′46″E
- Country: Poland
- Voivodeship: Pomeranian
- County: Słupsk
- Gmina: Smołdzino
- Population: 182

Łokciowe [wɔkˈt͡ɕɔvɛ] is a village in the administrative district of Gmina Smołdzino, within Słupsk County, Pomeranian Voivodeship, in northern Poland.
