= Człuchy =

- Village
- Location within Poland
- Coordinates: 54°39′56″N 17°11′46″E
- Country: Poland
- Voivodeship: Pomeranian
- County: Słupsk
- Gmina: Smołdzino
- Time zone: UTC+1 (CET)
  - Summer (DST): UTC+2 (CEST)
- Vehicle registration: GSL

Człuchy [ˈt͡ʂwuxɨ] (German: Schlochow) is a village in the administrative district of Gmina Smołdzino, within Słupsk County, Pomeranian Voivodeship, in northern Poland.
