= Gardna Mała =

- Village
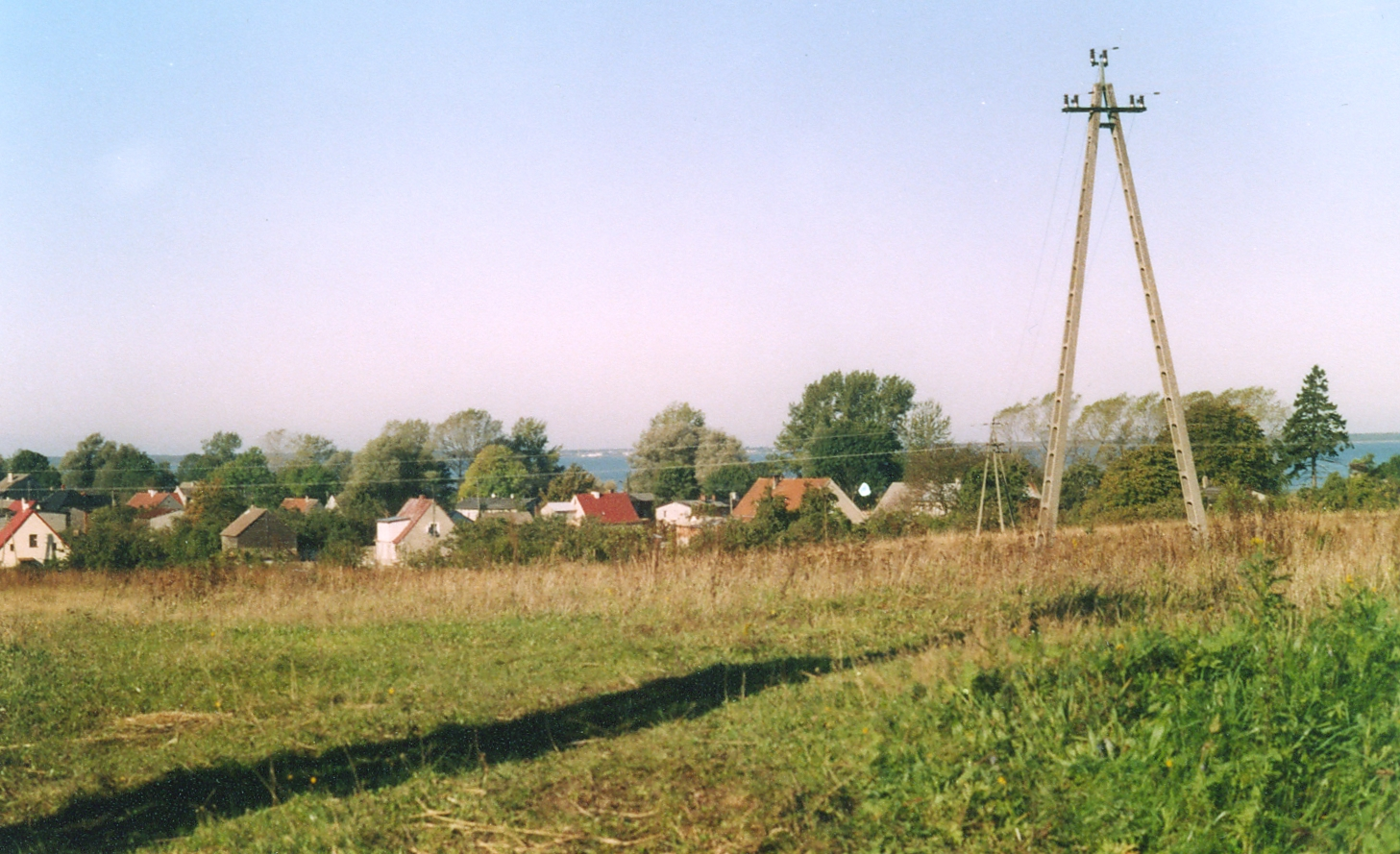

- Location within Poland
- Coordinates: 54°38′5″N 17°9′23″E
- Country: Poland
- Voivodeship: Pomeranian
- County: Słupsk
- Gmina: Smołdzino

Population
  - Total: 190

Gardna Mała [ˈɡardna ˈmawa] (German: Klein Garde) is a village in the administrative district of Gmina Smołdzino, within Słupsk County, Pomeranian Voivodeship, in northern Poland. It is located in the historic region of Pomerania.

== Etymology ==
The name is of the village is of native Slavic origin, and comes from the word gard. Historically, it was also known in Polish as Mała Garna.
