= Michael Brüggemann =

- Michôł Pontanus
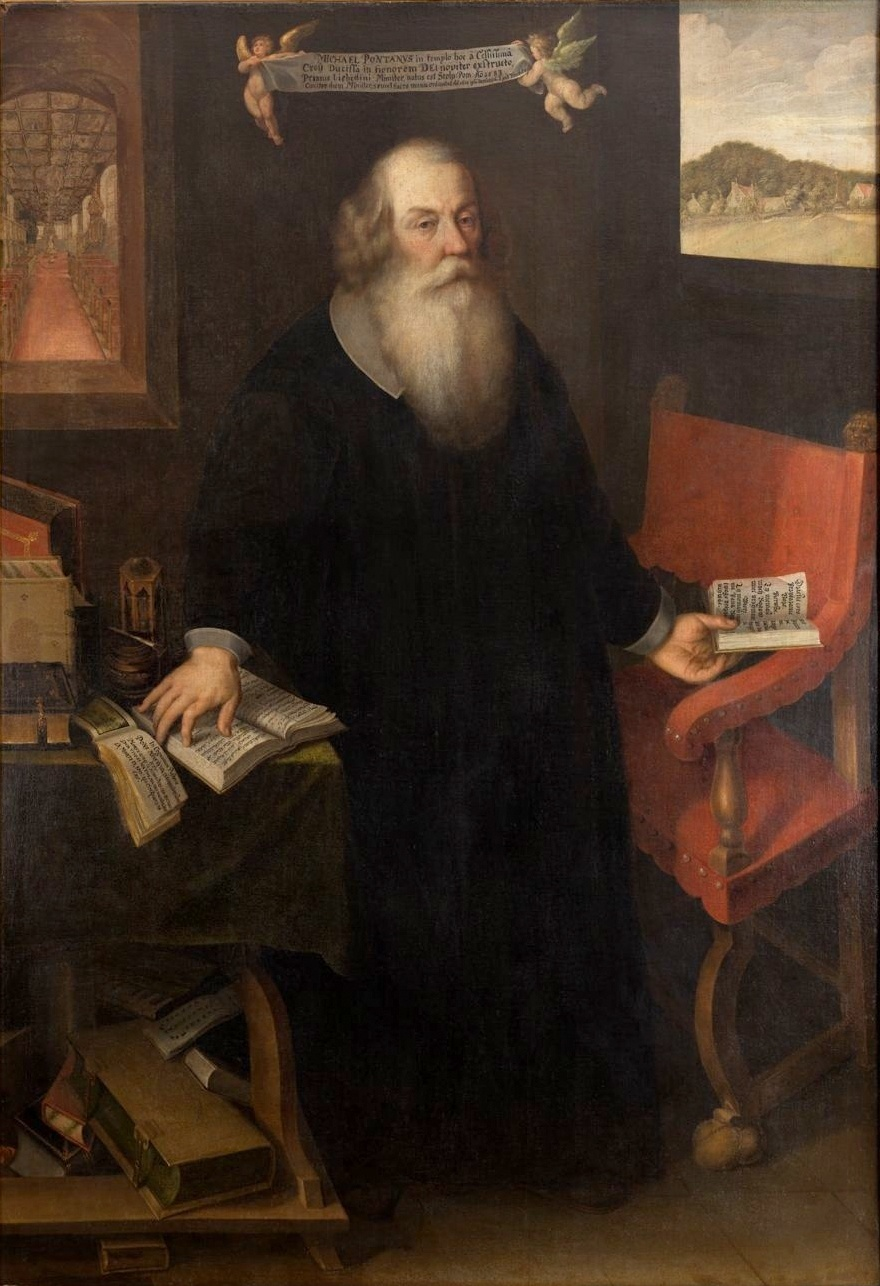
- A Golden Age portrait of Brüggemann from the collections of the Museum of Middle Pomerania

Personal life
- Born: 1583 Stolp, Duchy of Wolgast-Stolp, Holy Roman Empire
- Died: 1654 (aged 70–71) Schmolsin, Greater Poland Province, Polish–Lithuanian Commonwealth
- Parents: Jan (father); Elizabeth née Wurst (mother)

Religious life
- Religion: Christianity
- Denomination: Lutheran
- Church: Evangelical

Michael Brüggeman(n) (Kashubian: Michôł Pontanus; Latin: Pontanus; Polish: Michał Mostnik; 1583, Stolp – 1654) was a Lutheran pastor, preacher and translator living in the town of Schmolsin (Smołdzino), Duchy of Pomerania. He was born in Stolp (now Słupsk).

== History ==
Brüggemann was born in Stolp in 1583, as the son of a Kashubian carpenter, Jan, and Elizabeth née Wurst. After graduating from the city school, he spent many more years studying, first at the theological seminary in Magdeburg, then four years in Wittenberg (1606–10), he deepened his studies in Helmstedt, Jena, and Leipzig, before finally finishing them in Wittenberg.

Acting on the request of the last Griffin duchess, Anna von Croy, Brüggemann translated several liturgical texts, hymnals, prayer books and funeral speeches into Slovincian, a dialect of Kashubian. He also preached regularly in that language.
