= Wierzchocino =

- Village
- Location within Poland
- Coordinates: 54°37′53″N 17°15′24″E
- Country: Poland
- Voivodeship: Pomeranian
- County: Słupsk
- Gmina: Smołdzino
- Population: 221

Wierzchocino [vjɛʂxɔˈt͡ɕinɔ] (German: Virchenzin) is a village in the administrative district of Gmina Smołdzino, within Słupsk County, Pomeranian Voivodeship, in northern Poland.
