= Witkowo, Pomeranian Voivodeship =

Witkowo
- Village
- Location within Poland
- Coordinates: 54°37′5″N 17°14′20″E
- Country: Poland
- Voivodeship: Pomeranian
- County: Słupsk
- Gmina: Smołdzino
- Population: 40

Witkowo [vitˈkɔvɔ] (German: Vietkow) is a village in the administrative district of Gmina Smołdzino, within Słupsk County, Pomeranian Voivodeship, in northern Poland.
