= Żelkowo =

- Village
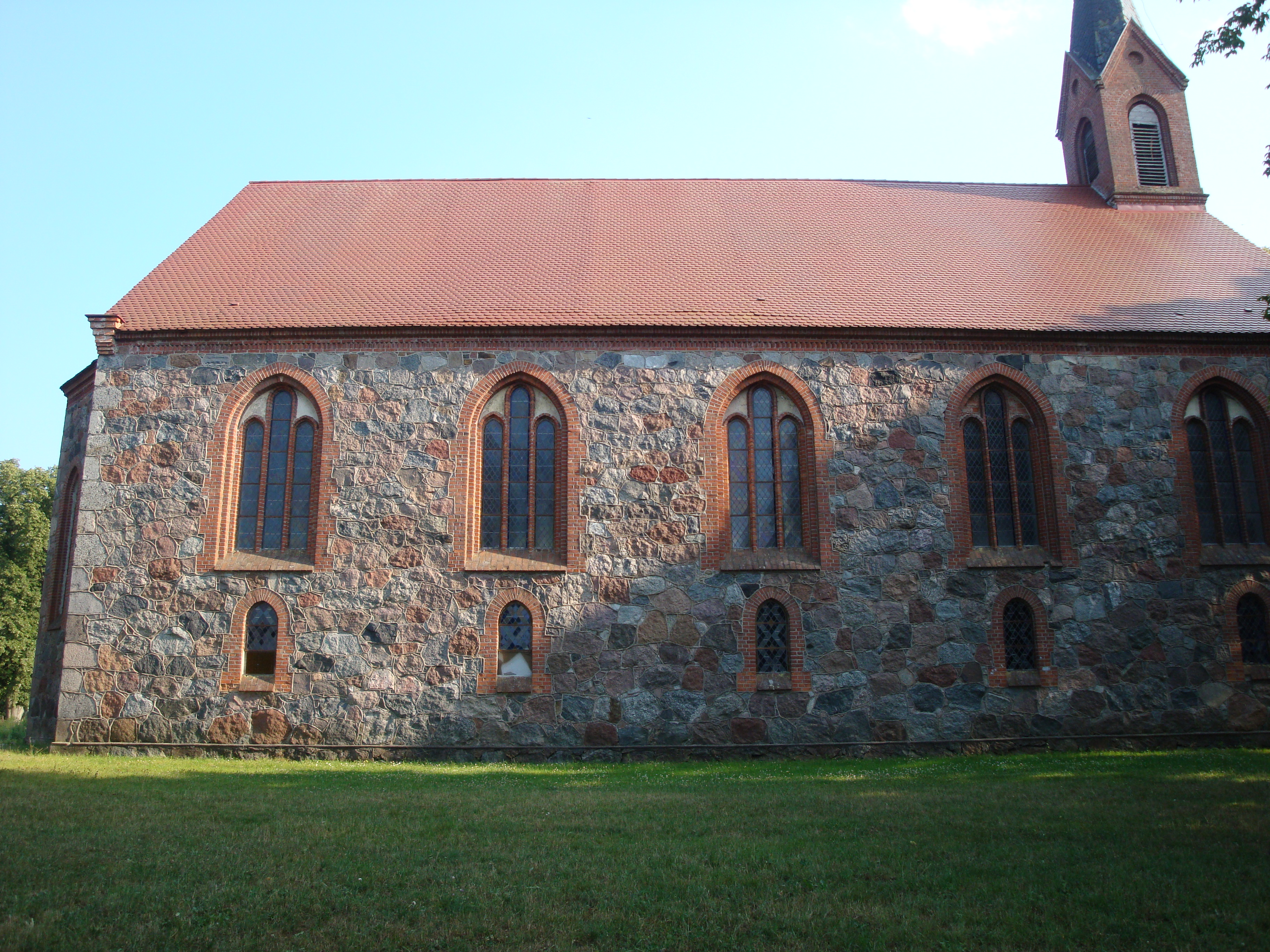
- St. Anthony church in Żelkowo

- Location within Poland
- Coordinates: 54°35′25″N 17°12′28″E
- Country: Poland
- Voivodeship: Pomeranian
- County: Słupsk
- Gmina: Główczyce
- Population: 280

Żelkowo [ʐɛlˈkɔvɔ] (German: Wendisch Silkow) is a village in the administrative district of Gmina Główczyce, within Słupsk County, Pomeranian Voivodeship, in northern Poland.

For the history of the region, see History of Pomerania.

The village has a church built in the first half of the 19th century. Near the village there is a hydro power-station on Łupawa river, built in 1906.
