= Kashubian grammar =

Grammar of the Kashubian language

The grammar of the Kashubian language is characterized by a high degree of inflection, and has relatively free word order, although the dominant arrangement is subject–verb–object (SVO). There are no articles. Distinctive features include the different treatment of masculine personal nouns in the plural, and the complex grammar of numerals and quantifiers.

== Morphology ==
Kashubian has a rich system of inflectional morphology, akin to that of other Slavic languages, including case, number, gender, tense, aspect, and mood.

=== Nouns ===
Kashubian displays seven cases inherited from Proto-Slavic. They are nominative, genitive, dative, accusative, instrumental, locative, and vocative case, but the vocative is very often replaced by the nominative.

Gender is usually reflected by the ending of a given noun stem. Nouns ending in a soft consonant, -a, and -ô are feminine. Masculine nouns end in a consonant and sometimes -a.

Some nouns are both masculine and feminine depending on the gender of the referent, e.g., kaléka (crippled person).

Kashubian has a singular and a plural number, with traces of an old dual remaining in some plurals (rãce, oczë, plecë, uszë), the instrumental plural ending -ama, and the now-plural pronoun wa, with the old plural becoming a polite pronoun.

The ending -ama is preferred standardly, and -ami appears dialectally.

==== Masculine nouns ====
	Masculine personal	
	Singular	Plural
Nominative (nazéwôcz )	chłop∅, pòeta	chłopi/chłopë, pòecë
Genitive (rodzôcz)	chłopa, pòetë	chłopów, pòetów
Dative (dôwôcz)	chłopù, pòece	chłopóm, pòetóm
Accusative (winowôcz)	chłopa, pòetã	chłopów, pòecë
Instrumental (narzãdzôcz)	chłopã, pòetą	chłopama/chłopami, pòetama, pòetami
Locative (môlnik)	chłopie, pòece	chłopach, pòetach
Vocative (wòłiwôcz)	chłopie, pòeto	chłopi/chłopë, pòecë

	Masculine animal			
	Singular		Plural	
	Hard	Soft	Hard	Soft
Nominative (nazéwôcz )	lës∅	kóń∅	lësë	kònie
Genitive (rodzôcz)	lësa	kònia	lësów	kònii/kòniów
Dative (dôwôcz)	lësowi	kòniowi/kòniewi/kòniu	lësom	kòniom
Accusative (winowôcz)	lësa	kònia	lëse	kònie
Instrumental (narzãdzôcz)	lësã	kòniã/kòniem	lësama/lësami	kòniama/kòniami
Locative (môlnik)	lësu	kòniu	lësach	kòniach
Vocative (wòłiwôcz)	lësu	kòniu	lëse	kònie

	Masculine inanimate			
	Singular		Plural	
	Hard	Soft	Hard	Soft
Nominative (nazéwôcz )	brzég∅	kosz∅	brzedżi	kosze
Genitive (rodzôcz)	brzega/brzegù	kosza	brzegów	koszi/koszów
Dative (dôwôcz)	brzegòwi	koszowi	brzegóm	koszóm
Accusative (winowôcz)	brzég∅	kosz∅	brzedżi	kosze
Instrumental (narzãdzôcz)	brzegã	koszã/koszem	brzegama/brzegami	koszama/koszami
Locative (môlnik)	brzegù	koszu	brzegach	koszach
Vocative (wòłiwôcz)	brzegù	koszu	brzedżi	kosze

Comments about the singular:

- Masculine nouns that end in a voiced consonant show regular vowel alternations of: ô:a, ó:o, é:e, ą:ã, i/u:ë. Mobile e (e:∅) also appears in some stems.
- Like in Polish, there is irregularity with genitive singular -u/-a, where animal/personal nouns always get -a, but inanimate nouns may get both. In northern dialects, -u may be replaced with -ë.
- Dative singular shows two endings, -ewi (for soft nouns)/-owi (for hard nouns) and -u. It has been suggested (BY LORENTZ gram 872) that personal/animal nouns have a preference for -ewi/-owi. Rarely an ending -owiu has been used by combining both endings (compare Masurian -oziu). An ending -ë (from a short /u/) exists in North-East Kashubia. Finally, the adjectival ending -omù (hard)/-emù (soft) is also used in the North-East.
- The instrumental singular ending -ã is used in the North-West for stylistic reasons or for rhymes.
- The locative singular ending -(i)e is for hard stems and -(i)u is for soft stems or nouns whose stems end with -k/-g/-ch, as well as -s/-z. An ending -ë (from a short /u/) exists in North-East Kashubia.
- Masculine nouns ending in -a decline femininely in the singular and masculinely in the plural.

Comments about the plural:

- The nominative plural has multiple endings, including -owie, -ë, -e, -i.
- The dative plural ending -ama may occasionally be seen.
- The instrumental plural endings -mi (without -a-') and -i are rare.
- The locative plural ending -ech can be seen in some names of countries, but is falling out of use and being replaced by -ach.

==== Feminine nouns ====
	Hard -a declension	
	Singular	Plural
Nominative (nazéwôcz )	gãba, noga	gãbë, nodżi
Genitive (rodzôcz)	gãbë, nodżi	gãbów, nogów/nóg∅
Dative (dôwôcz)	gãbie, nodze	gãbóm, nogóm
Accusative (winowôcz)	gãbã, nogã	gãbë, nodżi
Instrumental (narzãdzôcz)	gãbą, nogą	gãbama/gãbami, nogama/nogami
Locative (môlnik)	gãbie, nodze	gãbach, nogach
Vocative (wòłiwôcz)	gãbò, nogò	gãbë, nodżi

	Soft -a declension	
	Singular	Plural
Nominative (nazéwôcz )	zemia, òwca	zemie, òwce
Genitive (rodzôcz)	zemi/zemie, òwcë	zemi/zemiów, owiec∅/òwców
Dative (dôwôcz)	zemi, òwcë	zemióm, òwcóm
Accusative (winowôcz)	zemiã, òwcã	zemie, òwce
Instrumental (narzãdzôcz)	zemią, òwcą	zemiama/zemiami, òwcama/òwcami
Locative (môlnik)	zemi, òwcë	zemiach, òwcach
Vocative (wòłiwôcz)	zemia/zemio, òwco	zemie, òwce

Comments:

- Northern Kashubian dialects sometimes have -i in the locative singular for nouns ending in -ła, so szkòli instead of szkòle.

	Soft -ô declension	
	Singular	Plural
Nominative (nazéwôcz )	rolô, stëdniô	role/rolé, stëdnie/stëdnié
Genitive (rodzôcz)	rolë/roli/rolé/role, stëdni/stëdnié/stëdnie	roli/rolów, stëdni/stëdniów
Dative (dôwôcz)	roli/rolë/rolé, stëdnié	rolóm, stëdnióm
Accusative (winowôcz)	rolã, stëdniã	role/rolé, stëdnie/stëdnié
Instrumental (narzãdzôcz)	rolą, stëdnią	rolama/rolami, stëdniama/stëdniami
Locative (môlnik)	roli/rolë/rolé, stëdnié	rolach, stëdniach
Vocative (wòłiwôcz)	rolô, stëdniô	role/rolé, stëdnie/stëdnié

Comments:

- Northern dialects sometimes show syncretism in the accusative singular with the nominative singular, so rolô alongside rolã.
- The -∅ ending in the genitive plural is largely replaced with -ów except in common words.

	Latinate feminine -(i/ë)jô (soft)	
	Singular	Plural
Nominative (nazéwôcz )	proces(ë)jô	proces(ë)je
Genitive (rodzôcz)	proces(ë)jé/proces(ë)ji	proces(ë)jów/ procesyj∅
Dative (dôwôcz)	proces(ë)ji	proces(ë)jóm
Accusative (winowôcz)	proces(ë)jã	proces(ë)je
Instrumental (narzãdzôcz)	proces(ë)ją	proces(ë)jama/proces(ë)jami
Locative (môlnik)	proces(ë)ji	proces(ë)jach
Vocative (wòłiwôcz)	proces(ë)jô	proces(ë)je

	Feminine nouns ending in a consonant	
	Singular	Plural
Nominative (nazéwôcz )	chëcz∅, noc∅	chëcze, noce
Genitive (rodzôcz)	chëczë, nocë	chëczów, noców
Dative (dôwôcz)	chëczë, nocë	chëczóm, nocóm
Accusative (winowôcz)	chëcz∅, noc∅	chëcze, noce
Instrumental (narzãdzôcz)	chëczą, nocą	chëczama/chëczami, nocama/nocami
Locative (môlnik)	chëczë, nocë	chëczach, nocach
Vocative (wòłiwôcz)	chëczë, nocë	chëcze, noce

==== Neuter nouns ====
	Hard -o declension	
	Singular	Plural
Nominative (nazéwôcz )	pismò, biczëskò	pisma, biczëska
Genitive (rodzôcz)	pisma, biczëska	pismów, biczësków
Dative (dôwôcz)	pismu, biczëskù	pismóm, biczëskóm
Accusative (winowôcz)	pismò, biczëskò	pisma, biczëska
Instrumental (narzãdzôcz)	pismã, biczëskã	pismama/pismami, biczëskama/biczëskami
Locative (môlnik)	pismie, biczëskù	pismach, biczëskach
Vocative (wòłiwôcz)	pismò, biczëskò	gãba, biczëska

	Soft -e declension	
	Singular	Plural
Nominative (nazéwôcz )	serce	serca
Genitive (rodzôcz)	serca	serców
Dative (dôwôcz)	sercu	sercóm
Accusative (winowôcz)	serce	serca
Instrumental (narzãdzôcz)	sercã	sercama/sercami
Locative (môlnik)	sercu	sercach
Vocative (wòłiwôcz)	serce	serca

	Soft -é declension	
	Singular	Plural
Nominative (nazéwôcz )	kôzanié	kôzania
Genitive (rodzôcz)	kôzaniô/kôzaniégò/kôzania/kôzaniu/kôzanii	kôzaniów
Dative (dôwôcz)	kôzaniu/kôzaniémù/kôzaniowi	kôzanióm
Accusative (winowôcz)	kôzanié	kôzania
Instrumental (narzãdzôcz)	kôzaniã	kôzaniama/kôzaniami
Locative (môlnik)	kôzaniu/kôzanim	kôzaniach
Vocative (wòłiwôcz)	kôzanié	kôzania

	Soft -ã declension with an -n- stem	
	Singular	Plural
Nominative (nazéwôcz )	semiã	semiona
Genitive (rodzôcz)	semienia	semión∅/semionów
Dative (dôwôcz)	semieniu/semieniowi	semionóm
Accusative (winowôcz)	semiã	semiona
Instrumental (narzãdzôcz)	semieniã	semionama/semionami
Locative (môlnik)	semieniu	semionach
Vocative (wòłiwôcz)	semiã	semiona

	Soft -ã declension with a -t- stem	
	Singular	Plural
Nominative (nazéwôcz )	celã	celãta
Genitive (rodzôcz)	celãca	celãt∅/celąt∅
Dative (dôwôcz)	celãcu	celãtóm
Accusative (winowôcz)	celã	celãta
Instrumental (narzãdzôcz)	celãcã	celãtama/celãtami
Locative (môlnik)	celãcu	celãtach
Vocative (wòłiwôcz)	celã	celãta

Comments:

- Nouns ending in -é (chiefly gerunds) take adjectival endings in northern and central dialects.
- Nouns ending in -ã with -n- stems occasionally have a hard -n- in the singular.
- A few neuter nouns show ∅ in the genitive plural, and if the given noun's stem ends with a voiced consonant, regular vowel alternation can be observed, e.g. niebò -> niéb. In some cases a mobile e is also inserted.

=== Adjectives and adverbs ===
Kashubian adjectives agree in number, gender, and case with nouns. The vocative is syncretic with the nominative.

Kashubian retains many short form adjectives, whose base form may be used for all genders, but may also change their ending to agree in gender. They may be used as a predicative or as a possessive adjective or through German borrowings.

Short forms show regular vowel alternations.

The comparative degree is formed by adding -szi or sometimes -ejszi/-észi if the stem ends with two consonants, however -szy can also appear in the same conditions.

The superlative degree is formed nô-.

An analytic comparative may be formed with barżi and an analytic superlative with nôbarżi.

Hard declension		Singular			Plural		
Hard declension		Masculine	Feminine	Neuter	Masculine	Feminine	Neuter
Nominative, Vocative	personal	młodi	młodô	młodé	młodi	młodé	
Nominative, Vocative	non-personal	młodi	młodô	młodé	młodé	młodé	
Genitive		młodégò	młodi	młodégò	młodëch/młodich		
Dative		młodémù	młodi	młodémù	młodim		
Accusative	personal	młodégò	młodą	młodé	młodëch/młodich	młodé	
Accusative	non-personal animate	młodégò	młodą	młodé	młodé	młodé	
Accusative	inanimate	młodi	młodą	młodé	młodé	młodé	
Instrumental		młodim	młodą	młodim	młodima/młodëma/młodimi/młodëmi		
Locative		młodim	młodi	młodim	młodëch/młodich		

Soft declension		Singular			Plural		
Soft declension		Masculine	Feminine	Neuter	Masculine	Feminine	Neuter
Nominative, Vocative	personal	snôżi	snôżô	snôżé	snôżi	snôżé	
Nominative, Vocative	non-personal	snôżi	snôżô	snôżé	snôżé	snôżé	
Genitive		snôżégò	snôżi	snôżégò	snôżich		
Dative		snôżémù	snôżi	snôżémù	snôżim		
Accusative	personal	snôżégò	snôżą	snôżé	snôżich	snôżé	
Accusative	non-personal animate	snôżégò	snôżą	snôżé	snôżé	snôżé	
Accusative	inanimate	snôżi	snôżą	snôżé	snôżé	snôżé	
Instrumental		snôżim	snôżą	snôżim	snôżima/snôżimi		
Locative		snôżim	snôżi	snôżim	snôżich		

Possessive declension (-ów)		Singular			Plural		
Possessive declension (-ów)		Masculine	Feminine	Neuter	Masculine	Feminine	Neuter
Nominative, Vocative	personal	bratów∅	bratowa	bratowò/bratowé	bratowi	bratowé	
Nominative, Vocative	non-personal	bratów∅	bratowa	bratowò/bratowé	bratowé	bratowé	
Genitive		bratowégò	bratowi	bratowégò	bratowëch		
Dative		bratowémù	bratowi	bratowémù	bratowim		
Accusative	personal	bratowégò	bratową	bratowò/bratowé	bratowëch	bratowé	
Accusative	non-personal animate	bratowégò	bratową	bratowò/bratowé	bratowé	bratowé	
Accusative	inanimate	bratów∅	bratową	bratowò/bratowé	bratowé	bratowé	
Instrumental		bratowim	bratową	bratowim	bratowima		
Locative		bratowim	bratowi	bratowim	bratowëch		

Possessive declension (-in)		Singular			Plural		
Possessive declension (-in)		Masculine	Feminine	Neuter	Masculine	Feminine	Neuter
Nominative, Vocative	personal	Anin∅	Anina	Anino/Aniné	Aniny	Aniné	
Nominative, Vocative	non-personal	Anin∅	Anina	Anino/Aniné	Aniné	Aniné	
Genitive		Aninégò	Aniny	Aninégò	Aninëch		
Dative		Aninémù	Aniny	Aninémù	Aninym		
Accusative	personal	Aninégò	Aniną	Anino/Aniné	Aninëch	Aniné	
Accusative	non-personal animate	Aninégò	Aniną	Anino/Aniné	Aniné	Aniné	
Accusative	inanimate	Anin∅	Aniną	Anino/Aniné	Aniné	Aniné	
Instrumental		Aninym	Aniną	Aninym	Aninyma		
Locative		Aninym	Aniny	Aninym	Aninëch		

Deadjectival adverbs can be formed with either -e or -o and occasionally with -∅ as in szerok. The synthetic comparative is formed with -i, and the superlative with nô-, and the analytic comparative and superlative are formed the same way as the analytic comparative and superlatives of adjectives.

=== Verbs ===
Kashubian verbs agree for person, tense, aspect, and have participle forms as well as gerunds.

The formal pronoun Wë has special marking different from forms that agree with wa.

Kashubian has 4 conjugation patterns.

==== Class I ====
Conjugation I (-ã, -esz)
infinitive (wiezc)	Singular	Plural	Polite
1st	jô wiezã	më wiezemë	Wë wiezece
2nd	të wiezesz	wa wiezeta	Wë wiezece
3rd	òn, òna, òno wieze	òni, òne wiozą	Wë wiezece

==== Class II ====
Conjugation II (-ã, -isz)
infinitive (robic)	Singular	Plural	Polite
1st	jô robiã	më robimë	Wë robice
2nd	të robisz	wa robita	Wë robice
3rd	òn, òna, òno robi	òni, òne robią	Wë robice

==== Class III ====
Conjugation III (-óm, -ôsz)
infinitive (grac)	Singular	Plural	Polite
1st	jô gróm/jô grajã	më grómë/më grajemë	Wë grôce/Wë grajece
2nd	të grôsz/të grajesz	wa grôta/wa grajeta	Wë grôce/Wë grajece
3rd	òn, òna, òno grô/òn, òna, òno graje	òni, òne grają/ òni, òne grają	Wë grôce/Wë grajece

==== Class IV ====
Conjugation IV (-ém, -ész)
infinitive (wiedzec)	Singular	Plural	Polite
1st	jô wiém	më wiémë	Wë wiéce
2nd	të wiész	wa wiéta	Wë wiéce
3rd	òn, òna, òno wié	òni, òne wiedzą	Wë wiéce

==== bëc ====
bëc
infinitive (bëc)	Singular	Plural	Polite
1st	jô jem	më jesmë	Wë jesce
2nd	të jes	wa jesta	Wë jesce
3rd	òn, òna, òno je	òni, òne są	Wë jesce

==== Non-Present forms ====
The second person singular imperative is formed by using the bare verb stem (-∅), -ij(-ëj)/-i(-ë), or -ôj. The second person plural imperative is formed the same way and -ta is added. The first person plural imperative (the so-called hortative is formed the same way and -më is added.

When perfective verbs are inclined according to present endings, a future tense is formed. Imperfective verbs form the future using a future form of bëc and a past form or the infinitive.

The past tense is formed in 3 different ways:

Archaically with a present tense form of bëc and a past form.

The most common, modern way is to take a past tense form with a pronoun or noun. Regionally a combined form of że is added.

A type of past perfect can be formed using a present tense form of miec and the past participle of the verb.

Forms ending -ała can be shortened to -a.

An obsolete pluperfect can formed using the appropriate past form of bëc, followed by the past form of the verb, or by using a past form of bëc or miec plus the passive participle.

The subjunctive mood can be formed using bë and the past tense of the verb.

The passive voice is formed with bëc and the passive participle.

The infinitive ending is -c.

The active adverbial participle formed with -ąc (more common -ącë) is uncommon in spoken Kashubian, appearing more in literature.

The active adjectival participle is formed with -ący.

The passive adjectival participle is formed with -ty, -ny, or -ony, and to some extent -łi.

The anterior adverbial pariticple is formed with -łszë or -wszë from perfective verbs.

=== Pronouns ===
The possessive pronouns mój, twój, nasz, wasz, czij as well as the determiner pronouns ten, kòżdi, żôden, chtërny, sóm and the numeral jeden take adjectival declensions. The possessive pronouns sometimes have contracted forms, such as mégò.

The third person oblique forms such as jegò, ji/jé, jich/jejich have the alternative forms niegò, ni, nich when after a preposition.

Personal pronouns	Singular					Plural				
Personal pronouns	1st	2nd	3rd			1st	2nd	3rd		Polite
Personal pronouns	1st	2nd	masc.	fem.	neut.	1st	2nd	epic.	fem.	Polite
Nominative/vocative (nazéwôcz/wòłiwôcz)	jô	të	òn	òna	òno	më	wa	òni/ni	òne/ònë/në	Wë
Genitive (rodzôcz)	mie, mnie	cebie/ce	jegò/niegò/gò	ji/jé/ni	jegò	nas/naju	was/waju	jich/jejich/nich	jich/jejich/nich	Was
Dative (dôwôcz)	mie, mnie	tobie/cë/cebie	jemù/mù	ji	jemù/mù	nóm/nama/nami	wama	jim/jima	jim/jima	Wóm/Wami
Accusative (winowôcz)	mie, miã, mnie	cebie/ce/cã	jegò/jen/gò	jã/niã	je/nie	nas/naju	was/waju	jich	je	Was
Instrumental (narzãdzôcz)	mną	tobą	nim	nią	nim	nama	wama	nimi/jima/nima	nimi/jima/nima	Wama/Wami
Locative (môlnik)	mie/mnie	cebie/tobie	nim	ni	nim	nas/naju	was/waju	nich	nich	Was

Case
Case	reflexive sã/sebie
Nominative/vocative (nazéwôcz/wòłiwôcz)	—
Genitive (rodzôcz)	sebie/se/sã
Dative (dôwôcz)	sobie/se/so
Accusative (winowôcz)	sebie/sã/so
Instrumental (narzãdzôcz)	sobą
Locative (môlnik)	sebie/sobie

=== Numerals ===
Kashubian has a complex system of numerals and related quantifiers, with special rules for their inflection, for the case of the governed noun, and for verb agreement with the resulting noun phrase. Kashubian uses the long scale.

Numerals
Numeral	Cardinal	Ordinal
0.	nul	nulowi
1.	jeden	pierszi
2.	dwa	drëdżi
3.	trzë	trzecy
4.	sztërë	czwiôrti/czwôrti
5.	piãc	piąti
6.	szesc	szósti
7.	sétmë/sedem	sótmi/sódmi
8.	òsmë/òsem	ósmi
9.	dzewiãc	dzewiąti
10.	dzesãc	dzesąti
11.	jednôsce	jednôsti
12.	dwanôsce	dwanôsti
13.	trzënôsce	trzënôsti
14.	sztërnôsce	sztërnôsti
15.	piãtnôsce	piãtnôsti
16.	szestnôsce	szestnôsti
17.	sétmënôsce/sedemnôsce	sétmënôsti/sedemnôsti
18.	òsmënôsce/òsemnôsce	òsmënôsti/òsemnôsti
19.	dzewiãtnôsce	dzewiãtnôsti
20.	dwadzesce	dwadzesti
30.	trzëdzescë	trzëdzesti
40.	sztërdzescë	sztërdzesti
50.	piãcdzesąt	piãcdzesąti
60.	szescdzesąt	szescdzesąti
70.	sétmëdzesąt/sedemdzesąt	sétmëdzesąti/sedemdzesąti
80.	òsmëdzesąt/òsemdzesąt	òsmëdzesąti/òsemdzesąti
90.	dzewiãcdzesąt	dzewiãcdzesąti
100.	sto	setny
200.	dwasta	dwasetny
300.	trzësta	trzësetny
400.	sztërësta	sztërësetny
500.	piãcset	piãcsetny
600.	szescset	szescsetny
700.	sétmëset/sedemset	sétmësetny/sedemsetny
800.	òsmëset/òsemset	òsmësetny/òsemsetny
900.	dzewiãcset	dzewiãcsetny
1,000.	tësąc^{1}	tësączny
1,000,000.	milión^{1}	milionowi
1,000,000,000.	miliard^{1}	—
1,000,000,000,000.	bilión^{1}	—
^{1)} Grammatically a noun.

=== Other parts of speech ===
Some adverbs, pronouns, and all conjunctions, interjections, particles, and prepositions are indeclinable.

== Syntax ==
Kashubian has a typical set of sentence types, including declarative, nominal, exclamatory, imperative, interrogatory, and compound sentences.

== See also ==
- Slovincian grammar

== Bibliography ==
- Breza, Edward; Treder, Jerzy (1981). Maria Kowalewska (ed.). Gramatyka kaszubska: zarys popularny (in Polish). Gdańsk: Zrzeszenie Kaszubsko-Pomorskie (Kaszëbskò-Pòmòrsczé Zrzeszenié). ISBN 83-00-00102-6.
- Makùrôt, Hana (2016). Bożena Ugowska (ed.). Gramatika kaszëbsczégò jãzëka (PDF) (in Kashubian). Gdańsk: Zrzeszenie Kaszubsko-Pomorskie (Kaszëbskò-Pòmòrsczé Zrzeszenié). ISBN 978-83-62137-97-8.
