= Retowo, Pomeranian Voivodeship =

Retowo
- Village
- Location within Poland
- Coordinates: 54°37′57″N 17°07′27″E
- Country: Poland
- Voivodeship: Pomeranian
- County: Słupsk
- Gmina: Smołdzino

Retowo [rɛˈtɔvɔ] (German: Rotten) is a village in the administrative district of Gmina Smołdzino, within Słupsk County, Pomeranian Voivodeship, in northern Poland.
