= Komnino =

- Village
- Location within Poland
- Coordinates: 54°36′30″N 17°7′30″E
- Country: Poland
- Voivodeship: Pomeranian
- County: Słupsk
- Gmina: Smołdzino
- Population: 70

Komnino [kɔmˈninɔ] is a village in the administrative district of Gmina Smołdzino, within Słupsk County, Pomeranian Voivodeship, in northern Poland.
