= Bukowa, Pomeranian Voivodeship =

Bukowa
- Village
- Location within Poland
- Coordinates: 54°35′59″N 17°8′42″E
- Country: Poland
- Voivodeship: Pomeranian
- County: Słupsk
- Gmina: Smołdzino
- Population: 60

Bukowa [buˈkɔva] (German: Wendisch Buckow) is a village in the administrative district of Gmina Smołdzino, within Słupsk County, Pomeranian Voivodeship, in northern Poland.
