= Łódki =

- Village
- Location within Poland
- Coordinates: 54°37′32″N 17°6′47″E
- Country: Poland
- Voivodeship: Pomeranian
- County: Słupsk
- Gmina: Smołdzino

Łódki [ˈwutki] is a village in the administrative district of Gmina Smołdzino, within Słupsk County, Pomeranian Voivodeship, in northern Poland.
