= Czołpino =

- Village
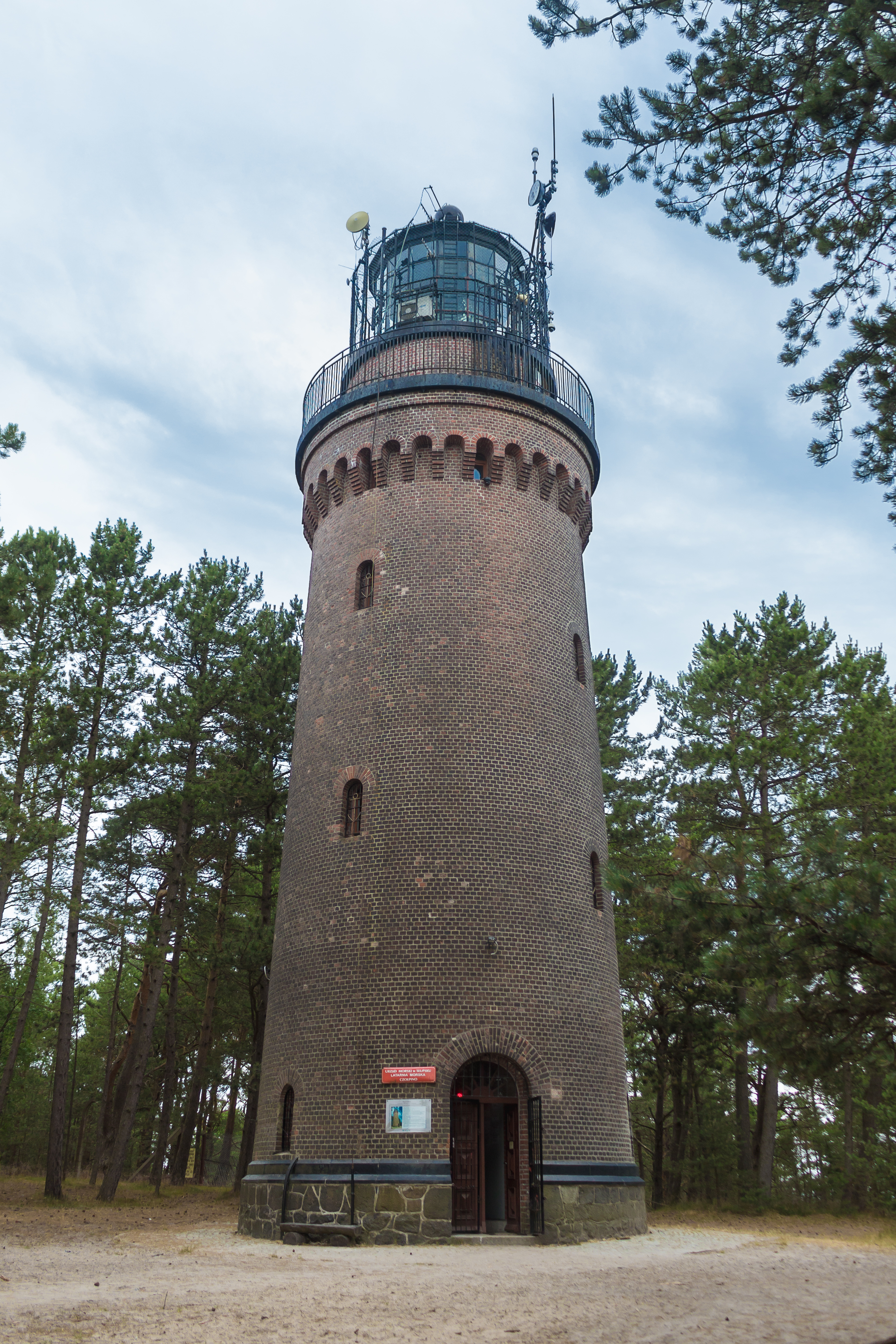
- Czołpino Lighthouse

- Location within Poland
- Coordinates: 54°42′37″N 17°14′20″E
- Country: Poland
- Voivodeship: Pomeranian
- County: Słupsk
- Gmina: Smołdzino
- Time zone: UTC+1 (CET)
  - Summer (DST): UTC+2 (CEST)
- Vehicle registration: GSL

Czołpino [t͡ʂɔu̯ˈpinɔ] (German: Scholpin) is a village in the administrative district of Gmina Smołdzino, within Słupsk County, Pomeranian Voivodeship, in northern Poland. It is within the Slovincian National Park, on the Slovincian Coast, in the historic region of Pomerania.

== History ==
The area became part of the emerging Polish state in the 10th century. Following Poland's fragmentation, it formed part of the Duchy of Pomerania and other splinter duchies. From the 18th century it was part of the Kingdom of Prussia, and from 1871 it was also part of Germany. Following Germany's defeat in World War II in 1945, the area became again part of Poland.
