= Gardna Wielka =

- Village
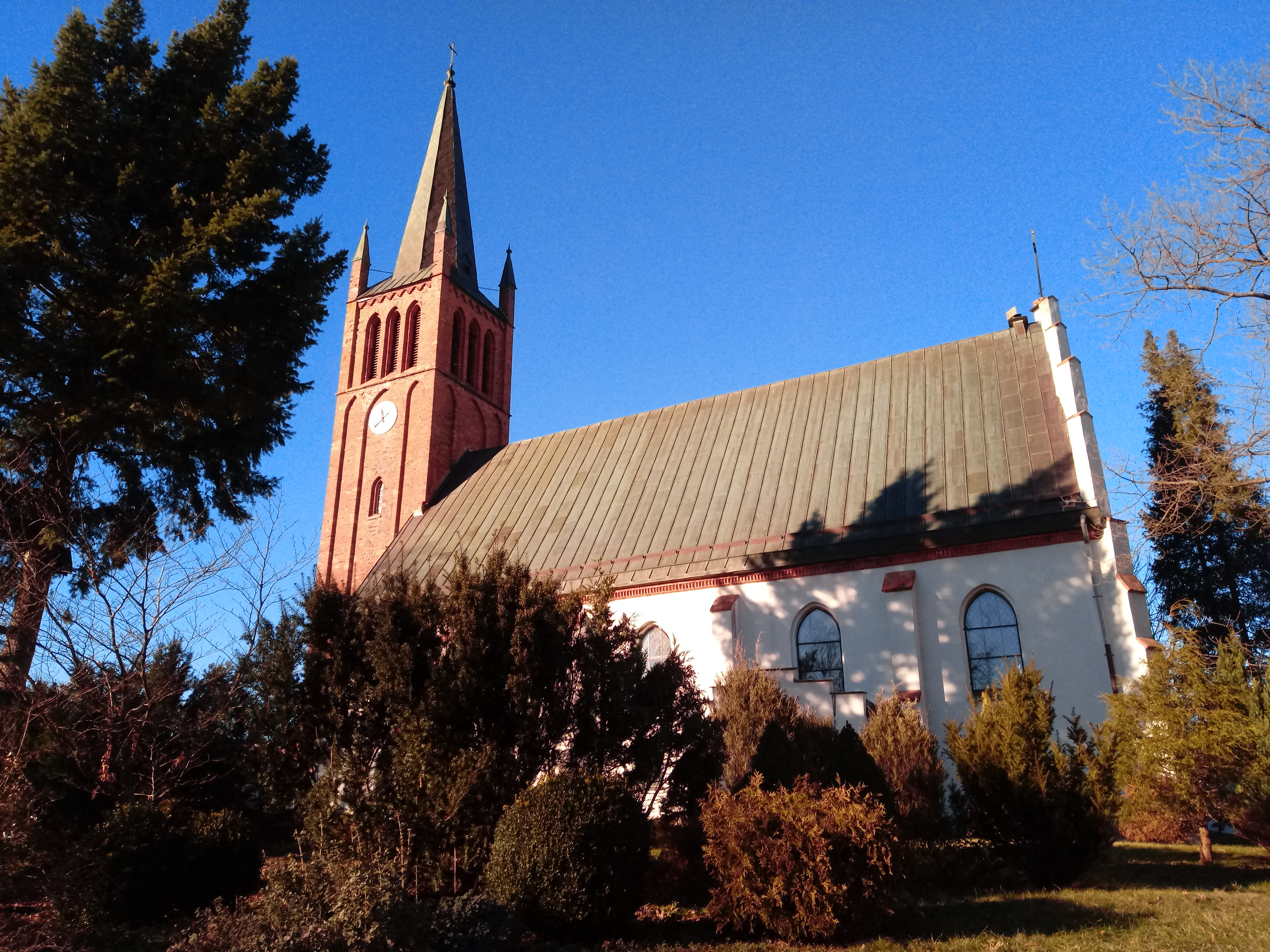
- Church of Visitation in Gardna Wielka

- Location within Poland
- Coordinates: 54°38′15″N 17°9′57″E
- Country: Poland
- Voivodeship: Pomeranian
- County: Słupsk
- Gmina: Smołdzino

Population
  - Total: 803
- Postal code: 76-213

Gardna Wielka [ˈɡardna ˈvjɛlka] (German: Groß Garde) is a village in the administrative district of Gmina Smołdzino, within Słupsk County, Pomeranian Voivodeship, in northern Poland. It is located in the historic region of Pomerania.

== Etymology ==
The name is of the village is of native Slavic origin, and comes from the word gard. Historically, it was also known in Polish as Wielka Garna.

== History ==
The first Slavic settlements and strongholds were established in the area in the 7th and 8th century. The territory became part of the emerging Polish state under its first ruler Mieszko I by c. 967. In the 12th century, Gardna became a town, but lost its importance and status in the 13th century. Following the fragmentation of Poland, it was at various times part of the duchies of Western Pomerania, Eastern Pomerania and Słupsk. The village was a possession of the Polish Archdiocese of Gniezno. In 1584, the local Lutheran pastor Blancenius translated the postil into Polish for local residents. From the 18th century, the village was part of the Kingdom of Prussia, and from 1871 to 1945 of unified Germany. In 1765, a riot broke out because the inhabitants refused to accept the newly appointed pastor, who did not speak Kashubian. Masses were held here in the Kashubian language until 1845. The inhabitants long resisted Germanisation.
