= Kluki, Pomeranian Voivodeship =

Kluki
- Village
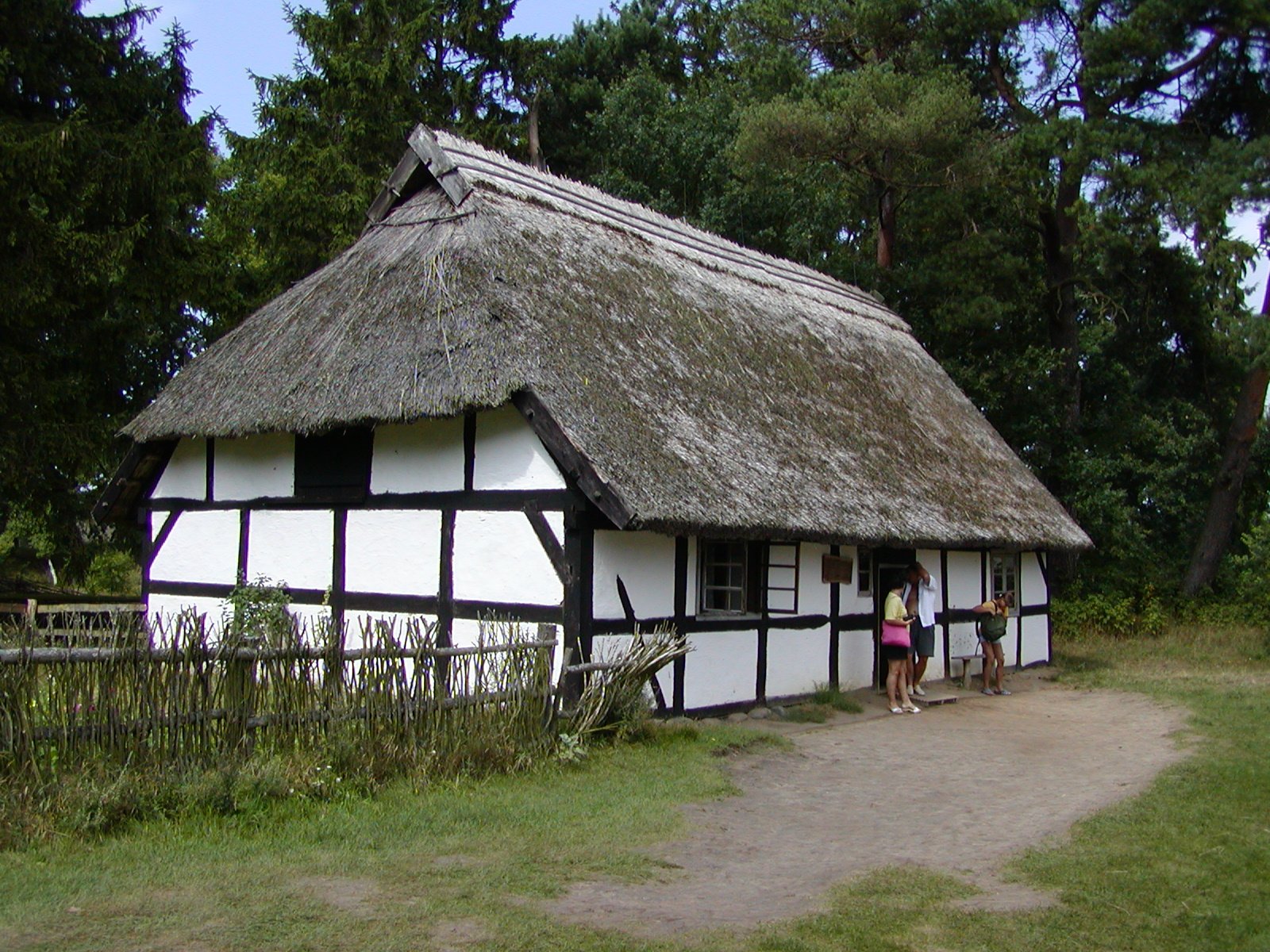
- Open-air museum in Kluki

- Location within Poland
- Coordinates: 54°40′56″N 17°20′9″E
- Country: Poland
- Voivodeship: Pomeranian
- County: Słupsk
- Gmina: Smołdzino
- Population: 90

Kluki [ˈkluki] (German: Klucken) is a village in the administrative district of Gmina Smołdzino, within Słupsk County, Pomeranian Voivodeship, in northern Poland.

Kluki was settled by the Slovincians and features an open-air museum, Muzeum Wsi Słowińskiej (Museum of the Slovincian Village), a division of the Muzeum Pomorza Środkowego w Słupsku (Central Pomerania Museum in Słupsk).
