= Wysoka, Słupsk County =

Wysoka
- Village
- Location within Poland
- Coordinates: 54°37′54″N 17°8′53″E
- Country: Poland
- Voivodeship: Pomeranian
- County: Słupsk
- Gmina: Smołdzino
- Population: 60

Wysoka [vɨˈsɔka] (German: Wittstock) is a village in the administrative district of Gmina Smołdzino, within Słupsk County, Pomeranian Voivodeship, in northern Poland.
