= Smołdzino, Kartuzy County =

Village in Kashubia

Smołdzino Smôłdzëno
- Village
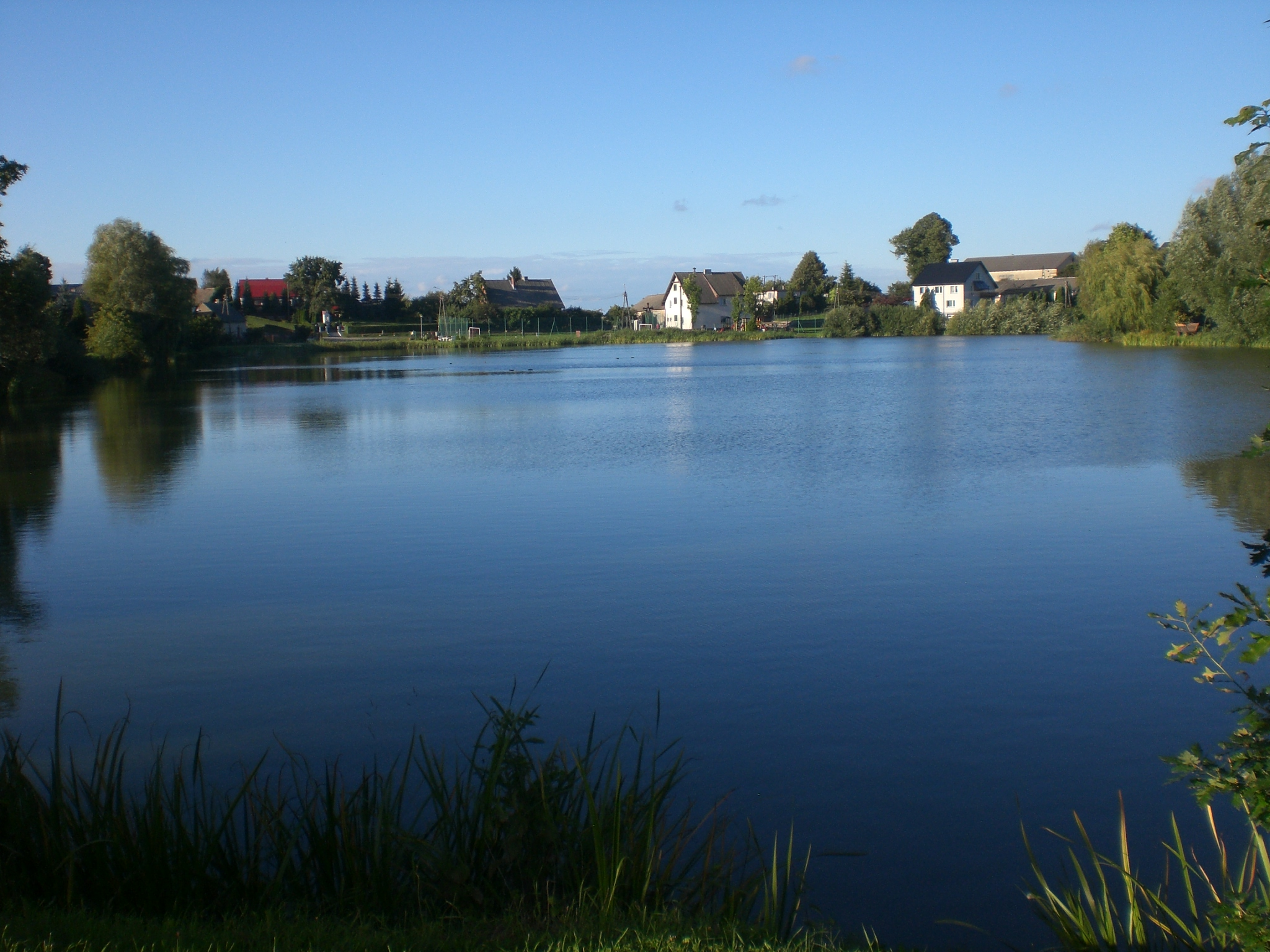

- Location within Poland
- Coordinates: 54°21′20″N 18°18′10″E
- Country: Poland
- Voivodeship: Pomeranian
- County: Kartuzy
- Gmina: Przodkowo
- Population: 247

Smołdzino [smɔu̯ˈd͡ʑinɔ] (Kashubian: Smôłdzëno) is a village in the administrative district of Gmina Przodkowo, within Kartuzy County, Pomeranian Voivodeship, in northern Poland.

For details of the history of the region, see History of Pomerania.
