= Żelazo, Pomeranian Voivodeship =

Żelazo
- Village
- Location within Poland
- Coordinates: 54°38′58″N 17°15′15″E
- Country: Poland
- Voivodeship: Pomeranian
- County: Słupsk
- Gmina: Smołdzino
- Population: 312

Żelazo [ʐɛˈlazɔ] (German: Selesen) is a village in the administrative district of Gmina Smołdzino, within Słupsk County, Pomeranian Voivodeship, in northern Poland.
