= Stojcino =

- Village
- Location within Poland
- Coordinates: 54°37′39″N 17°11′21″E
- Country: Poland
- Voivodeship: Pomeranian
- County: Słupsk
- Gmina: Smołdzino
- Population: 123

Stojcino [stɔi̯ˈt͡ɕinɔ] (German: Stohentin) is a village in the administrative district of Gmina Smołdzino, within Słupsk County, Pomeranian Voivodeship, in northern Poland.
