= Helene Zelazo Center for the Performing Arts =

Coordinates: 43°04′27.4″N 87°52′47.3″W

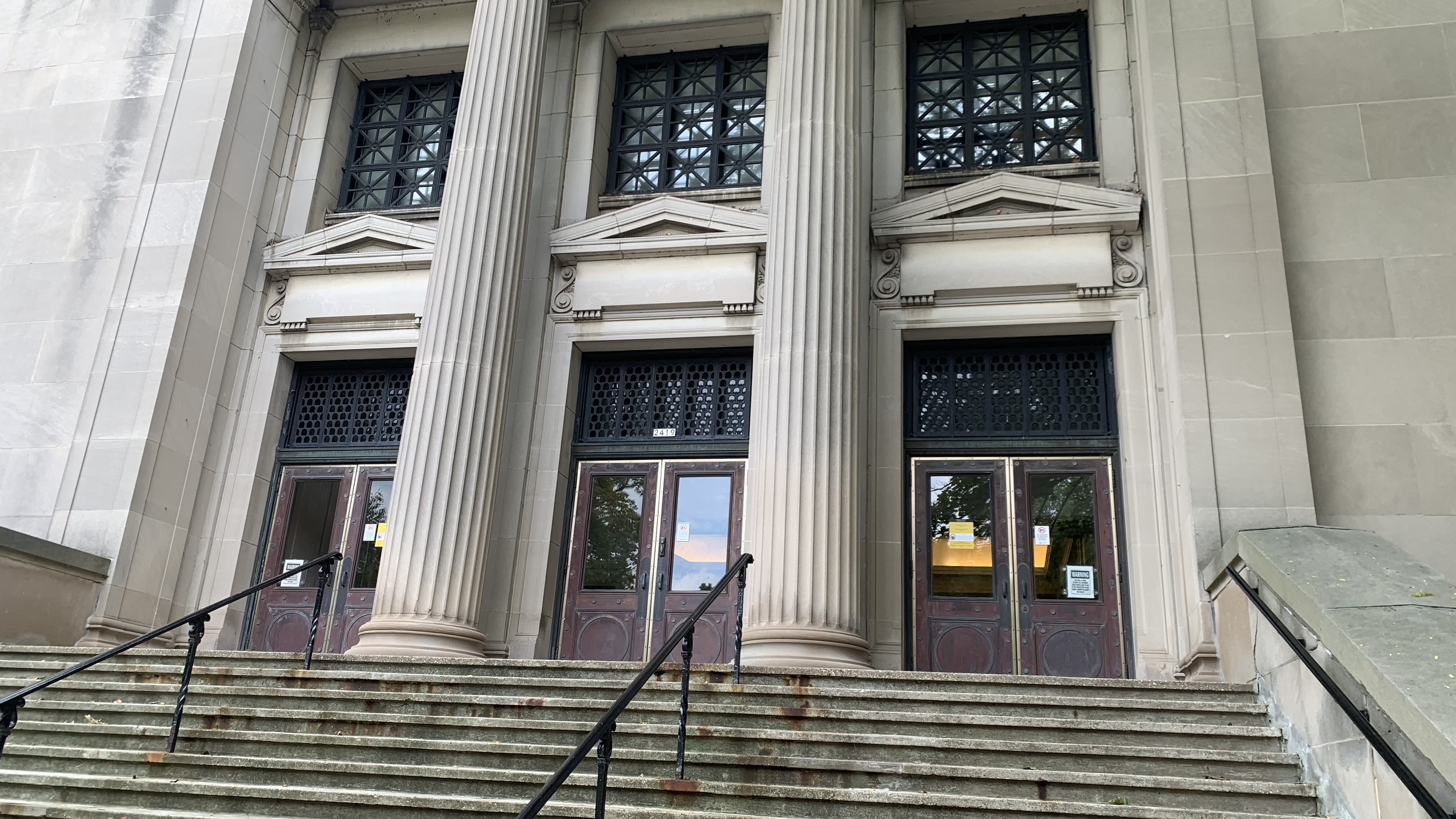
The Center in October 2023

The Helene Zelazo Center for the Performing Arts (more often referred to as the "Zelazo Center" or the "ZPAC") is a performing arts center located on the campus of the University of Wisconsin–Milwaukee. It houses the 756-seat Helen Bader Concert Hall, large rehearsal spaces, meeting facilities, music offices, and dance studios for the UWM Peck School of the Arts. The Zelazo Center is one of many facilities maintained by the Peck School of the Arts, including the Fine Arts Building, as well as Kenilworth Square East.

== History ==
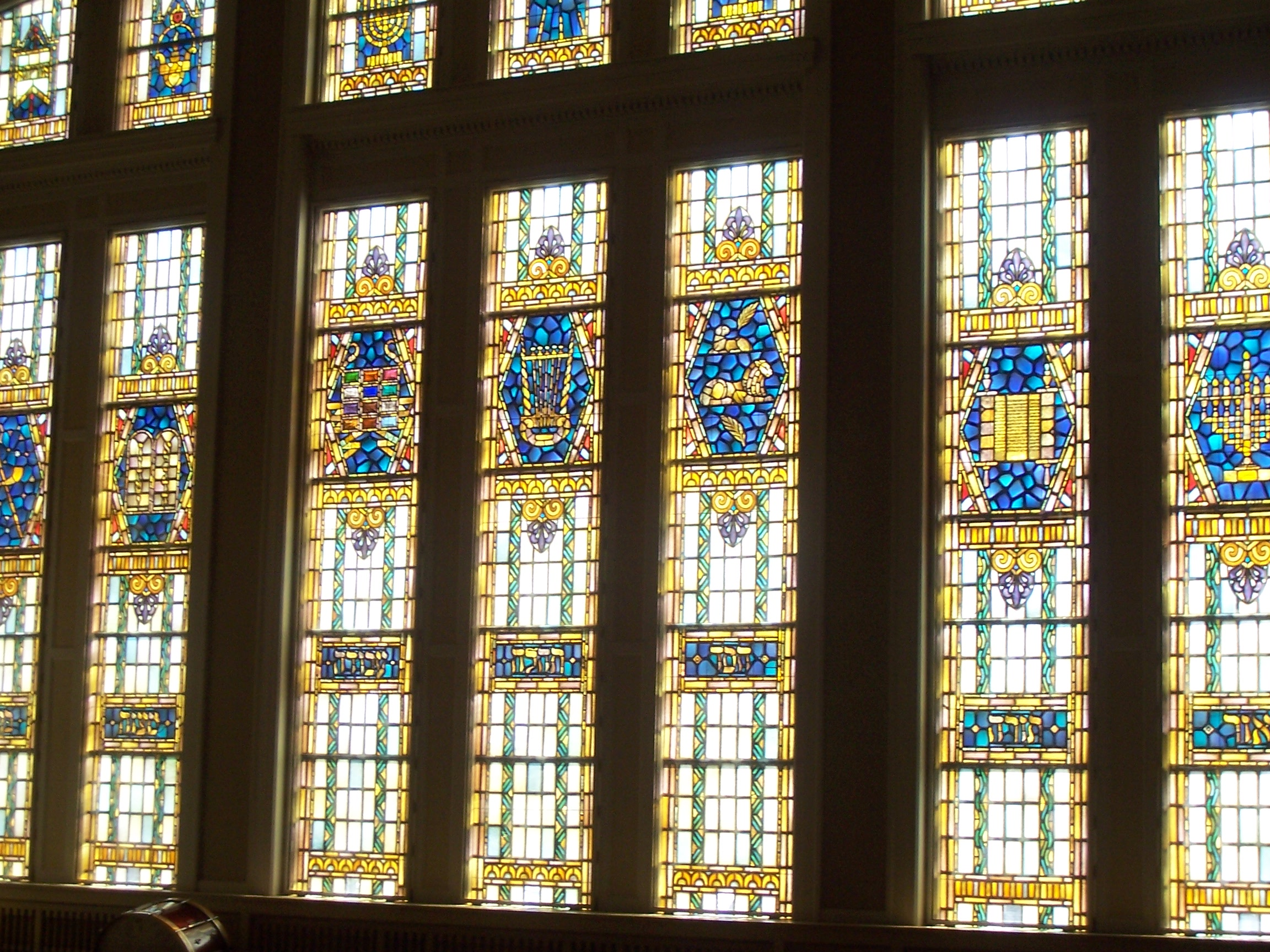
The Helene Zelazo Center for the Performing Arts.

The Zelazo Center was acquired by UWM in October 2000 from Congregation Emanu-El B'ne Jeshurun, who had used the structure as a synagogue since 1922. UWM's renovation primarily focused on converting the worship space into the Helen Bader Concert Hall. Many architectural elements from the building's years as a synagogue still exist, including many prominent Star of David symbols and elaborate stained glass work. The art windows of the Helen Bader Concert Hall were designed by Milwaukee Rabbi Joseph L. Baron who served the community from 1926 to 1960. The 14 individual windows contain Hebrew words and symbols of Jewish idealism.

The Zelazo Center is named in recognition of the lead donation for the acquisition made by the Nathaniel K. Zelazo Revocable Trust. The building was dedicated on February 16, 2001.

== UWM's Performing Arts Center ==
The facility serves many various needs for the UWM Peck School of the Arts. It is the primary teaching studio space for the trombone, euphonium, tuba, harp, string bass, percussion, and guitar programs at UWM. The building also houses the offices for the large ensemble programs, including the offices for the UWM Youth Wind Ensemble program. The facility contains 3 dance studios, a large rehearsal room, a medium-sized rehearsal room, two art galleries, a service kitchen, and various meeting facilities in addition to the Helen Bader Concert Hall. The facility is a sought out meeting and banquet facility for many local and regional organizations.

== Ensembles of Residence ==
The Zelazo Center houses all large music ensembles for the UWM Music Department, including the UWM Symphony Orchestra, Wind Ensemble, Symphony Band, University Band, and some student recitals and chamber performances. The facility is the full-time rehearsal and performance space for the UWM Youth Wind Ensemble Program and UWM Community Orchestra. It is also used by Chamber Music Milwaukee, as well as the Fine Arts Quartet and Early Music Now. While the performance space is predominantly a concert hall, it is occasionally used as a performance venue for theater, opera, and spoken word events.
