= Czysta, Pomeranian Voivodeship =

Czysta
- Village
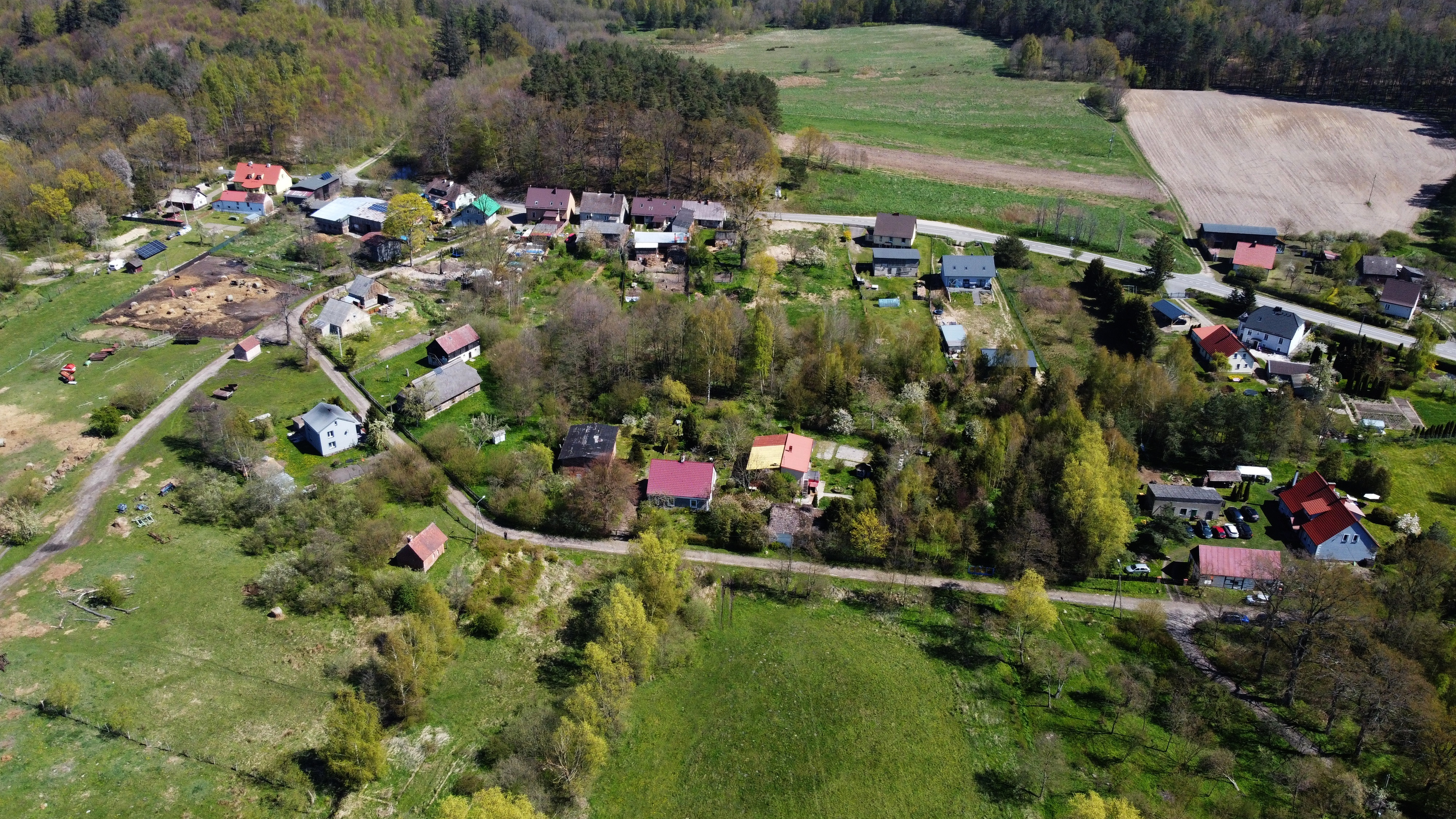
- Czysta, 2023

- Location within Poland
- Coordinates: 54°37′9″N 17°8′19″E
- Country: Poland
- Voivodeship: Pomeranian
- County: Słupsk
- Gmina: Smołdzino
- Population: 163

Czysta [ˈt͡ʂɨsta] (German: Wittbeck) is a village in the administrative district of Gmina Smołdzino, within Słupsk County, Pomeranian Voivodeship, in northern Poland.
