= Komnino railway station =

Railway station in Poland

Komnino

General information
- Location: Komnino; Poland
- Coordinates: 54.605735°N 17.116940°E
- Owner: Polskie Koleje Państwowe S.A.
- Platforms: None

Construction
- Structure type: Building: No; Depot: No; Water tower: No

History
- Former names: Kuhnhof
Location

Komnino is a non-operational PKP railway station in Komnino (Pomeranian Voivodeship), Poland.

== Lines crossing the station ==
Start station	End station	Line type
Kępno	Komnino	Dismantled
Komnino	Ustka	Dismantled
Komnino	Siecie-Wierzchocino	Dismantled
