= Smołdzino, Słupsk County =

Smołdzino
- Village
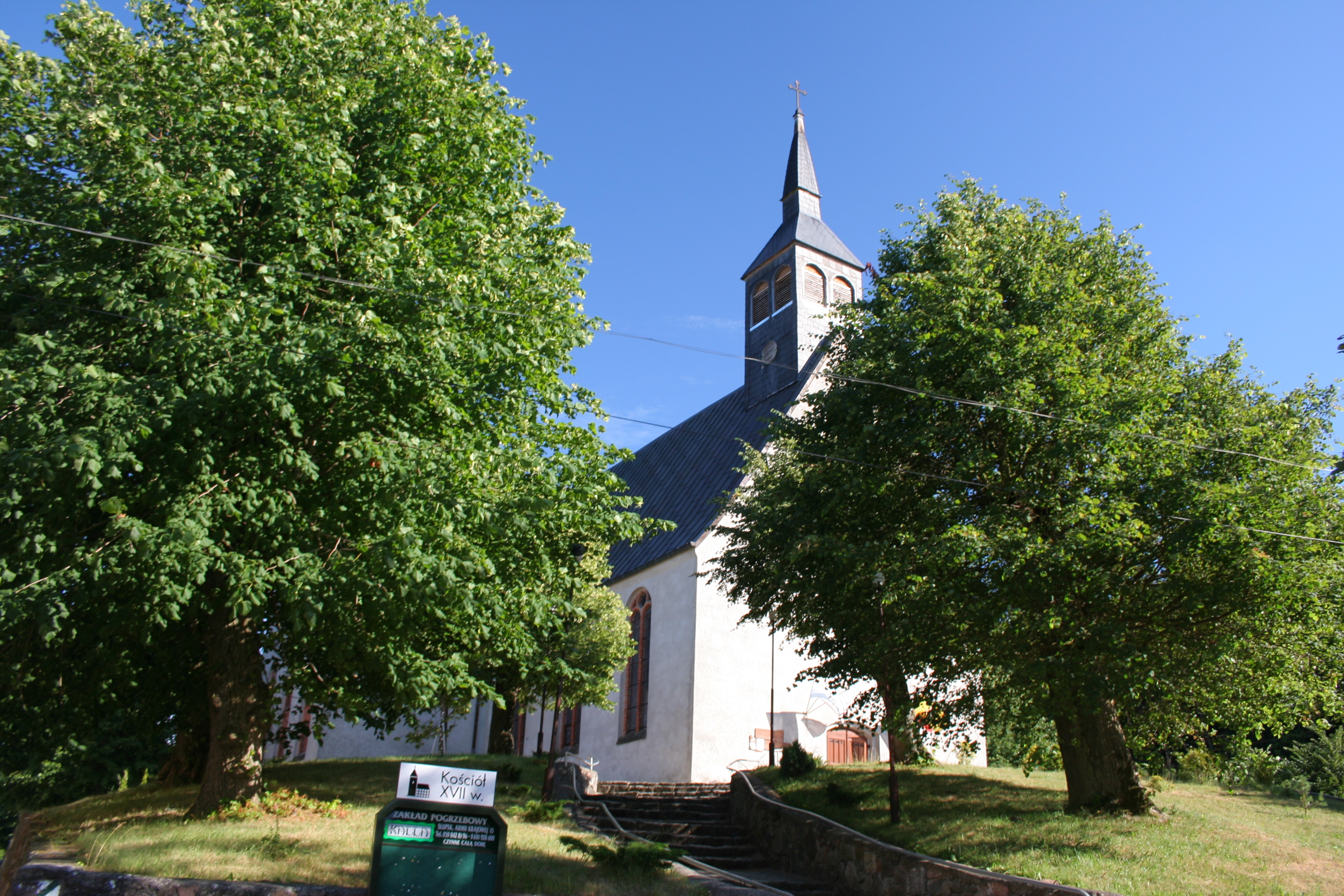
- Church of the Holy Trinity

- Location within Poland
- Coordinates: 54°39′48″N 17°12′49″E
- Country: Poland
- Voivodeship: Pomeranian
- County: Słupsk
- Gmina: Smołdzino

Population
  - Total: 984
- Time zone: UTC+1 (CET)
  - Summer (DST): UTC+2 (CEST)
- Vehicle registration: GSL

Smołdzino [smɔu̯ˈd͡ʑinɔ] (German: Schmolsin) is a village in Słupsk County, Pomeranian Voivodeship, in northern Poland. It is the seat of the gmina (administrative district) called Gmina Smołdzino.

== Etymology ==
The name of the village is of Slavic origin, and comes from the words smłód or smoła.

== History ==
The territory became part of the emerging Polish state under its first ruler Mieszko I by c. 967. Following the fragmentation of Poland into smaller duchies, it was at various times part of the duchies of Western Pomerania, Eastern Pomerania and Słupsk. The earliest known reference to the village comes from 1281. In 1291, it was granted to the Oliwa Abbey by Duke Bogusław IV. From 1329 to 1341, the village belonged to the Teutonic Order.

In 1622, the estate returned to the House of Griffin. Anna of Pomerania, the last duchess of the House of Griffin, spent her final years there and founded the local church. Local pastor Michał Mostnik (1583–1654) was the author of prayer books and hymnals in the Slovincian language. After the extinction of the House of Griffin, the village passed to the Margraviate of Brandenburg, and later to the Kingdom of Prussia. Between 1830 and 1838, the village was the scene of riots when the locals drove out the pastor, refused to pay taxes for the German school, and carried out several arson attacks in defence of the Polish language against Germanisation policies. The last sermon in Polish was delivered in 1883. With the defeat of Germany in World War II, in 1945, the village became again part of Poland.
