= Siecie-Wierzchocino railway station =

Railway station in Siecie, Poland

Siecie-Wierzchocino

General information
- Location: Siecie; Poland
- Owner: Polskie Koleje Państwowe S.A.
- Platforms: None

Construction
- Structure type: Building: No; Depot: No; Water tower: No

History
- Former names: Zietzen-Virchenzin
Location

Siecie-Wierzchocino is a non-operational PKP railway station in Siecie (Pomeranian Voivodeship), Poland.

== Lines crossing the station ==
Start station	End station	Line type
Komnino	Siecie-Wierzchocino	Dismantled
Siecie-Wierzchocino	Smołdzino	Dismantled
Żelkowo	Siecie-Wierzchocino	Dismantled
